

131001–131100 

|-bgcolor=#E9E9E9
| 131001 ||  || — || November 27, 2000 || Socorro || LINEAR || — || align=right | 1.8 km || 
|-id=002 bgcolor=#fefefe
| 131002 ||  || — || November 18, 2000 || Anderson Mesa || LONEOS || — || align=right | 1.6 km || 
|-id=003 bgcolor=#E9E9E9
| 131003 ||  || — || November 19, 2000 || Anderson Mesa || LONEOS || — || align=right | 2.3 km || 
|-id=004 bgcolor=#fefefe
| 131004 ||  || — || November 19, 2000 || Kitt Peak || Spacewatch || — || align=right | 1.6 km || 
|-id=005 bgcolor=#E9E9E9
| 131005 ||  || — || December 3, 2000 || Desert Beaver || W. K. Y. Yeung || — || align=right | 3.0 km || 
|-id=006 bgcolor=#E9E9E9
| 131006 ||  || — || December 1, 2000 || Socorro || LINEAR || — || align=right | 4.2 km || 
|-id=007 bgcolor=#E9E9E9
| 131007 ||  || — || December 1, 2000 || Socorro || LINEAR || — || align=right | 4.8 km || 
|-id=008 bgcolor=#E9E9E9
| 131008 ||  || — || December 1, 2000 || Socorro || LINEAR || — || align=right | 2.9 km || 
|-id=009 bgcolor=#E9E9E9
| 131009 ||  || — || December 1, 2000 || Socorro || LINEAR || — || align=right | 3.0 km || 
|-id=010 bgcolor=#E9E9E9
| 131010 ||  || — || December 1, 2000 || Socorro || LINEAR || JUN || align=right | 2.2 km || 
|-id=011 bgcolor=#E9E9E9
| 131011 ||  || — || December 1, 2000 || Socorro || LINEAR || — || align=right | 3.9 km || 
|-id=012 bgcolor=#E9E9E9
| 131012 ||  || — || December 1, 2000 || Socorro || LINEAR || — || align=right | 3.2 km || 
|-id=013 bgcolor=#E9E9E9
| 131013 ||  || — || December 1, 2000 || Socorro || LINEAR || MAR || align=right | 2.3 km || 
|-id=014 bgcolor=#fefefe
| 131014 ||  || — || December 4, 2000 || Socorro || LINEAR || EUT || align=right | 1.1 km || 
|-id=015 bgcolor=#E9E9E9
| 131015 ||  || — || December 1, 2000 || Socorro || LINEAR || — || align=right | 2.9 km || 
|-id=016 bgcolor=#E9E9E9
| 131016 ||  || — || December 4, 2000 || Socorro || LINEAR || — || align=right | 3.9 km || 
|-id=017 bgcolor=#E9E9E9
| 131017 ||  || — || December 4, 2000 || Socorro || LINEAR || — || align=right | 2.4 km || 
|-id=018 bgcolor=#E9E9E9
| 131018 ||  || — || December 4, 2000 || Socorro || LINEAR || ADE || align=right | 3.8 km || 
|-id=019 bgcolor=#E9E9E9
| 131019 ||  || — || December 4, 2000 || Socorro || LINEAR || — || align=right | 1.9 km || 
|-id=020 bgcolor=#E9E9E9
| 131020 ||  || — || December 4, 2000 || Socorro || LINEAR || GER || align=right | 3.9 km || 
|-id=021 bgcolor=#E9E9E9
| 131021 ||  || — || December 4, 2000 || Socorro || LINEAR || ADE || align=right | 5.2 km || 
|-id=022 bgcolor=#E9E9E9
| 131022 ||  || — || December 5, 2000 || Socorro || LINEAR || — || align=right | 5.0 km || 
|-id=023 bgcolor=#E9E9E9
| 131023 ||  || — || December 5, 2000 || Socorro || LINEAR || — || align=right | 4.9 km || 
|-id=024 bgcolor=#E9E9E9
| 131024 ||  || — || December 4, 2000 || Socorro || LINEAR || — || align=right | 2.6 km || 
|-id=025 bgcolor=#E9E9E9
| 131025 ||  || — || December 4, 2000 || Socorro || LINEAR || — || align=right | 4.9 km || 
|-id=026 bgcolor=#E9E9E9
| 131026 ||  || — || December 5, 2000 || Socorro || LINEAR || — || align=right | 2.9 km || 
|-id=027 bgcolor=#E9E9E9
| 131027 ||  || — || December 5, 2000 || Socorro || LINEAR || MAR || align=right | 2.6 km || 
|-id=028 bgcolor=#E9E9E9
| 131028 ||  || — || December 5, 2000 || Socorro || LINEAR || EUN || align=right | 2.3 km || 
|-id=029 bgcolor=#E9E9E9
| 131029 ||  || — || December 5, 2000 || Socorro || LINEAR || GER || align=right | 4.7 km || 
|-id=030 bgcolor=#E9E9E9
| 131030 ||  || — || December 5, 2000 || Socorro || LINEAR || BRU || align=right | 4.6 km || 
|-id=031 bgcolor=#E9E9E9
| 131031 ||  || — || December 7, 2000 || Socorro || LINEAR || — || align=right | 2.9 km || 
|-id=032 bgcolor=#E9E9E9
| 131032 ||  || — || December 4, 2000 || Socorro || LINEAR || — || align=right | 3.5 km || 
|-id=033 bgcolor=#E9E9E9
| 131033 ||  || — || December 4, 2000 || Socorro || LINEAR || — || align=right | 3.5 km || 
|-id=034 bgcolor=#E9E9E9
| 131034 ||  || — || December 6, 2000 || Socorro || LINEAR || — || align=right | 3.4 km || 
|-id=035 bgcolor=#fefefe
| 131035 ||  || — || December 5, 2000 || Uccle || T. Pauwels || — || align=right | 1.4 km || 
|-id=036 bgcolor=#fefefe
| 131036 || 2000 YE || — || December 16, 2000 || Socorro || LINEAR || PHO || align=right | 2.1 km || 
|-id=037 bgcolor=#E9E9E9
| 131037 || 2000 YN || — || December 16, 2000 || Socorro || LINEAR || HNS || align=right | 2.6 km || 
|-id=038 bgcolor=#E9E9E9
| 131038 || 2000 YP || — || December 16, 2000 || Socorro || LINEAR || — || align=right | 3.8 km || 
|-id=039 bgcolor=#E9E9E9
| 131039 ||  || — || December 17, 2000 || Socorro || LINEAR || — || align=right | 2.7 km || 
|-id=040 bgcolor=#fefefe
| 131040 ||  || — || December 16, 2000 || Uccle || T. Pauwels || NYS || align=right | 1.4 km || 
|-id=041 bgcolor=#E9E9E9
| 131041 ||  || — || December 24, 2000 || Haleakala || NEAT || — || align=right | 2.3 km || 
|-id=042 bgcolor=#E9E9E9
| 131042 ||  || — || December 23, 2000 || Desert Beaver || W. K. Y. Yeung || — || align=right | 3.4 km || 
|-id=043 bgcolor=#E9E9E9
| 131043 ||  || — || December 22, 2000 || Socorro || LINEAR || — || align=right | 3.3 km || 
|-id=044 bgcolor=#E9E9E9
| 131044 ||  || — || December 23, 2000 || Socorro || LINEAR || — || align=right | 2.9 km || 
|-id=045 bgcolor=#FA8072
| 131045 ||  || — || December 30, 2000 || Socorro || LINEAR || — || align=right | 1.5 km || 
|-id=046 bgcolor=#fefefe
| 131046 ||  || — || December 30, 2000 || Socorro || LINEAR || — || align=right | 1.6 km || 
|-id=047 bgcolor=#E9E9E9
| 131047 ||  || — || December 28, 2000 || Socorro || LINEAR || — || align=right | 5.2 km || 
|-id=048 bgcolor=#E9E9E9
| 131048 ||  || — || December 30, 2000 || Socorro || LINEAR || — || align=right | 2.6 km || 
|-id=049 bgcolor=#fefefe
| 131049 ||  || — || December 30, 2000 || Socorro || LINEAR || — || align=right | 1.7 km || 
|-id=050 bgcolor=#fefefe
| 131050 ||  || — || December 30, 2000 || Socorro || LINEAR || NYS || align=right | 1.7 km || 
|-id=051 bgcolor=#fefefe
| 131051 ||  || — || December 30, 2000 || Socorro || LINEAR || NYS || align=right | 2.6 km || 
|-id=052 bgcolor=#fefefe
| 131052 ||  || — || December 30, 2000 || Socorro || LINEAR || V || align=right | 1.2 km || 
|-id=053 bgcolor=#E9E9E9
| 131053 ||  || — || December 30, 2000 || Socorro || LINEAR || — || align=right | 2.1 km || 
|-id=054 bgcolor=#E9E9E9
| 131054 ||  || — || December 30, 2000 || Socorro || LINEAR || — || align=right | 1.9 km || 
|-id=055 bgcolor=#E9E9E9
| 131055 ||  || — || December 30, 2000 || Socorro || LINEAR || — || align=right | 4.1 km || 
|-id=056 bgcolor=#E9E9E9
| 131056 ||  || — || December 30, 2000 || Socorro || LINEAR || — || align=right | 5.1 km || 
|-id=057 bgcolor=#E9E9E9
| 131057 ||  || — || December 30, 2000 || Socorro || LINEAR || — || align=right | 4.0 km || 
|-id=058 bgcolor=#fefefe
| 131058 ||  || — || December 30, 2000 || Socorro || LINEAR || MAS || align=right | 1.8 km || 
|-id=059 bgcolor=#E9E9E9
| 131059 ||  || — || December 30, 2000 || Socorro || LINEAR || — || align=right | 2.2 km || 
|-id=060 bgcolor=#E9E9E9
| 131060 ||  || — || December 30, 2000 || Socorro || LINEAR || — || align=right | 2.2 km || 
|-id=061 bgcolor=#fefefe
| 131061 ||  || — || December 30, 2000 || Socorro || LINEAR || — || align=right | 3.9 km || 
|-id=062 bgcolor=#E9E9E9
| 131062 ||  || — || December 30, 2000 || Socorro || LINEAR || — || align=right | 1.7 km || 
|-id=063 bgcolor=#E9E9E9
| 131063 ||  || — || December 30, 2000 || Socorro || LINEAR || — || align=right | 1.9 km || 
|-id=064 bgcolor=#E9E9E9
| 131064 ||  || — || December 30, 2000 || Socorro || LINEAR || — || align=right | 1.9 km || 
|-id=065 bgcolor=#E9E9E9
| 131065 ||  || — || December 30, 2000 || Socorro || LINEAR || — || align=right | 3.1 km || 
|-id=066 bgcolor=#E9E9E9
| 131066 ||  || — || December 30, 2000 || Socorro || LINEAR || MAR || align=right | 2.7 km || 
|-id=067 bgcolor=#E9E9E9
| 131067 ||  || — || December 30, 2000 || Socorro || LINEAR || — || align=right | 2.6 km || 
|-id=068 bgcolor=#fefefe
| 131068 ||  || — || December 30, 2000 || Socorro || LINEAR || FLO || align=right | 2.4 km || 
|-id=069 bgcolor=#E9E9E9
| 131069 ||  || — || December 30, 2000 || Socorro || LINEAR || — || align=right | 2.2 km || 
|-id=070 bgcolor=#E9E9E9
| 131070 ||  || — || December 30, 2000 || Socorro || LINEAR || — || align=right | 2.4 km || 
|-id=071 bgcolor=#E9E9E9
| 131071 ||  || — || December 30, 2000 || Socorro || LINEAR || — || align=right | 2.4 km || 
|-id=072 bgcolor=#fefefe
| 131072 ||  || — || December 30, 2000 || Socorro || LINEAR || MAS || align=right | 1.5 km || 
|-id=073 bgcolor=#fefefe
| 131073 ||  || — || December 30, 2000 || Socorro || LINEAR || NYS || align=right | 1.7 km || 
|-id=074 bgcolor=#E9E9E9
| 131074 ||  || — || December 30, 2000 || Socorro || LINEAR || — || align=right | 2.1 km || 
|-id=075 bgcolor=#E9E9E9
| 131075 ||  || — || December 30, 2000 || Socorro || LINEAR || — || align=right | 3.0 km || 
|-id=076 bgcolor=#E9E9E9
| 131076 ||  || — || December 28, 2000 || Socorro || LINEAR || — || align=right | 2.4 km || 
|-id=077 bgcolor=#E9E9E9
| 131077 ||  || — || December 28, 2000 || Socorro || LINEAR || — || align=right | 3.9 km || 
|-id=078 bgcolor=#fefefe
| 131078 ||  || — || December 30, 2000 || Socorro || LINEAR || NYS || align=right | 2.8 km || 
|-id=079 bgcolor=#E9E9E9
| 131079 ||  || — || December 30, 2000 || Socorro || LINEAR || — || align=right | 2.6 km || 
|-id=080 bgcolor=#E9E9E9
| 131080 ||  || — || December 30, 2000 || Socorro || LINEAR || — || align=right | 2.9 km || 
|-id=081 bgcolor=#E9E9E9
| 131081 ||  || — || December 29, 2000 || Anderson Mesa || LONEOS || — || align=right | 2.7 km || 
|-id=082 bgcolor=#E9E9E9
| 131082 ||  || — || December 21, 2000 || Socorro || LINEAR || EUN || align=right | 3.0 km || 
|-id=083 bgcolor=#E9E9E9
| 131083 ||  || — || December 28, 2000 || Socorro || LINEAR || — || align=right | 4.5 km || 
|-id=084 bgcolor=#E9E9E9
| 131084 ||  || — || December 28, 2000 || Socorro || LINEAR || — || align=right | 4.7 km || 
|-id=085 bgcolor=#fefefe
| 131085 ||  || — || December 29, 2000 || Anderson Mesa || LONEOS || NYS || align=right | 1.6 km || 
|-id=086 bgcolor=#E9E9E9
| 131086 ||  || — || December 29, 2000 || Anderson Mesa || LONEOS || EUN || align=right | 2.8 km || 
|-id=087 bgcolor=#E9E9E9
| 131087 ||  || — || December 29, 2000 || Haleakala || NEAT || — || align=right | 2.7 km || 
|-id=088 bgcolor=#d6d6d6
| 131088 ||  || — || December 30, 2000 || Socorro || LINEAR || — || align=right | 5.1 km || 
|-id=089 bgcolor=#E9E9E9
| 131089 ||  || — || December 17, 2000 || Anderson Mesa || LONEOS || — || align=right | 2.6 km || 
|-id=090 bgcolor=#E9E9E9
| 131090 ||  || — || December 23, 2000 || Socorro || LINEAR || — || align=right | 2.6 km || 
|-id=091 bgcolor=#E9E9E9
| 131091 ||  || — || December 31, 2000 || Anderson Mesa || LONEOS || MAR || align=right | 2.8 km || 
|-id=092 bgcolor=#E9E9E9
| 131092 ||  || — || December 30, 2000 || Socorro || LINEAR || — || align=right | 1.7 km || 
|-id=093 bgcolor=#E9E9E9
| 131093 ||  || — || December 31, 2000 || Anderson Mesa || LONEOS || BRU || align=right | 5.4 km || 
|-id=094 bgcolor=#E9E9E9
| 131094 ||  || — || January 2, 2001 || Socorro || LINEAR || EUN || align=right | 2.2 km || 
|-id=095 bgcolor=#E9E9E9
| 131095 ||  || — || January 2, 2001 || Socorro || LINEAR || — || align=right | 2.0 km || 
|-id=096 bgcolor=#E9E9E9
| 131096 ||  || — || January 2, 2001 || Socorro || LINEAR || — || align=right | 2.0 km || 
|-id=097 bgcolor=#fefefe
| 131097 ||  || — || January 2, 2001 || Socorro || LINEAR || — || align=right | 1.8 km || 
|-id=098 bgcolor=#E9E9E9
| 131098 ||  || — || January 2, 2001 || Socorro || LINEAR || — || align=right | 3.5 km || 
|-id=099 bgcolor=#E9E9E9
| 131099 ||  || — || January 2, 2001 || Socorro || LINEAR || — || align=right | 5.1 km || 
|-id=100 bgcolor=#E9E9E9
| 131100 ||  || — || January 2, 2001 || Socorro || LINEAR || — || align=right | 4.6 km || 
|}

131101–131200 

|-bgcolor=#fefefe
| 131101 ||  || — || January 3, 2001 || Socorro || LINEAR || V || align=right | 1.2 km || 
|-id=102 bgcolor=#fefefe
| 131102 ||  || — || January 3, 2001 || Socorro || LINEAR || NYS || align=right | 1.5 km || 
|-id=103 bgcolor=#E9E9E9
| 131103 ||  || — || January 5, 2001 || Socorro || LINEAR || — || align=right | 3.7 km || 
|-id=104 bgcolor=#E9E9E9
| 131104 ||  || — || January 5, 2001 || Socorro || LINEAR || — || align=right | 2.5 km || 
|-id=105 bgcolor=#fefefe
| 131105 ||  || — || January 4, 2001 || Socorro || LINEAR || NYS || align=right | 1.5 km || 
|-id=106 bgcolor=#fefefe
| 131106 ||  || — || January 4, 2001 || Socorro || LINEAR || NYS || align=right | 1.8 km || 
|-id=107 bgcolor=#E9E9E9
| 131107 ||  || — || January 4, 2001 || Socorro || LINEAR || EUN || align=right | 2.3 km || 
|-id=108 bgcolor=#E9E9E9
| 131108 ||  || — || January 4, 2001 || Socorro || LINEAR || — || align=right | 2.2 km || 
|-id=109 bgcolor=#E9E9E9
| 131109 ||  || — || January 4, 2001 || Socorro || LINEAR || — || align=right | 1.7 km || 
|-id=110 bgcolor=#E9E9E9
| 131110 ||  || — || January 4, 2001 || Socorro || LINEAR || — || align=right | 2.7 km || 
|-id=111 bgcolor=#E9E9E9
| 131111 ||  || — || January 5, 2001 || Socorro || LINEAR || GEF || align=right | 5.2 km || 
|-id=112 bgcolor=#E9E9E9
| 131112 ||  || — || January 5, 2001 || Socorro || LINEAR || EUN || align=right | 2.9 km || 
|-id=113 bgcolor=#E9E9E9
| 131113 ||  || — || January 15, 2001 || Socorro || LINEAR || — || align=right | 2.2 km || 
|-id=114 bgcolor=#E9E9E9
| 131114 ||  || — || January 15, 2001 || Socorro || LINEAR || — || align=right | 5.1 km || 
|-id=115 bgcolor=#E9E9E9
| 131115 || 2001 BN || — || January 17, 2001 || Oizumi || T. Kobayashi || — || align=right | 3.7 km || 
|-id=116 bgcolor=#E9E9E9
| 131116 || 2001 BS || — || January 17, 2001 || Oizumi || T. Kobayashi || JUN || align=right | 1.9 km || 
|-id=117 bgcolor=#E9E9E9
| 131117 ||  || — || January 16, 2001 || Haleakala || NEAT || RAF || align=right | 2.3 km || 
|-id=118 bgcolor=#E9E9E9
| 131118 ||  || — || January 18, 2001 || Socorro || LINEAR || CLO || align=right | 3.6 km || 
|-id=119 bgcolor=#fefefe
| 131119 ||  || — || January 18, 2001 || Socorro || LINEAR || CIM || align=right | 5.3 km || 
|-id=120 bgcolor=#E9E9E9
| 131120 ||  || — || January 18, 2001 || Socorro || LINEAR || — || align=right | 2.6 km || 
|-id=121 bgcolor=#E9E9E9
| 131121 ||  || — || January 19, 2001 || Socorro || LINEAR || — || align=right | 3.3 km || 
|-id=122 bgcolor=#fefefe
| 131122 ||  || — || January 19, 2001 || Kitt Peak || Spacewatch || NYS || align=right | 1.2 km || 
|-id=123 bgcolor=#E9E9E9
| 131123 ||  || — || January 20, 2001 || Socorro || LINEAR || — || align=right | 2.8 km || 
|-id=124 bgcolor=#E9E9E9
| 131124 ||  || — || January 20, 2001 || Socorro || LINEAR || — || align=right | 2.6 km || 
|-id=125 bgcolor=#E9E9E9
| 131125 ||  || — || January 20, 2001 || Socorro || LINEAR || — || align=right | 4.4 km || 
|-id=126 bgcolor=#E9E9E9
| 131126 ||  || — || January 20, 2001 || Socorro || LINEAR || — || align=right | 3.1 km || 
|-id=127 bgcolor=#E9E9E9
| 131127 ||  || — || January 20, 2001 || Socorro || LINEAR || — || align=right | 2.6 km || 
|-id=128 bgcolor=#E9E9E9
| 131128 ||  || — || January 20, 2001 || Socorro || LINEAR || — || align=right | 2.1 km || 
|-id=129 bgcolor=#E9E9E9
| 131129 ||  || — || January 19, 2001 || Socorro || LINEAR || — || align=right | 4.2 km || 
|-id=130 bgcolor=#E9E9E9
| 131130 ||  || — || January 19, 2001 || Socorro || LINEAR || — || align=right | 2.3 km || 
|-id=131 bgcolor=#E9E9E9
| 131131 ||  || — || January 19, 2001 || Socorro || LINEAR || GEF || align=right | 2.6 km || 
|-id=132 bgcolor=#fefefe
| 131132 ||  || — || January 21, 2001 || Socorro || LINEAR || V || align=right | 1.1 km || 
|-id=133 bgcolor=#E9E9E9
| 131133 ||  || — || January 24, 2001 || Socorro || LINEAR || GEF || align=right | 2.2 km || 
|-id=134 bgcolor=#E9E9E9
| 131134 ||  || — || January 19, 2001 || Socorro || LINEAR || — || align=right | 2.6 km || 
|-id=135 bgcolor=#E9E9E9
| 131135 ||  || — || January 21, 2001 || Socorro || LINEAR || — || align=right | 4.4 km || 
|-id=136 bgcolor=#E9E9E9
| 131136 ||  || — || January 21, 2001 || Socorro || LINEAR || — || align=right | 2.6 km || 
|-id=137 bgcolor=#E9E9E9
| 131137 ||  || — || January 21, 2001 || Socorro || LINEAR || — || align=right | 5.0 km || 
|-id=138 bgcolor=#E9E9E9
| 131138 ||  || — || January 28, 2001 || Oizumi || T. Kobayashi || — || align=right | 3.9 km || 
|-id=139 bgcolor=#E9E9E9
| 131139 ||  || — || January 17, 2001 || Kitt Peak || Spacewatch || — || align=right | 3.2 km || 
|-id=140 bgcolor=#E9E9E9
| 131140 ||  || — || January 17, 2001 || Haleakala || NEAT || — || align=right | 2.8 km || 
|-id=141 bgcolor=#E9E9E9
| 131141 ||  || — || January 18, 2001 || Haleakala || NEAT || RAF || align=right | 2.1 km || 
|-id=142 bgcolor=#fefefe
| 131142 ||  || — || January 20, 2001 || Socorro || LINEAR || — || align=right | 1.9 km || 
|-id=143 bgcolor=#E9E9E9
| 131143 ||  || — || January 26, 2001 || Socorro || LINEAR || — || align=right | 4.9 km || 
|-id=144 bgcolor=#E9E9E9
| 131144 ||  || — || January 29, 2001 || Socorro || LINEAR || — || align=right | 4.6 km || 
|-id=145 bgcolor=#d6d6d6
| 131145 ||  || — || January 27, 2001 || Haleakala || NEAT || — || align=right | 5.8 km || 
|-id=146 bgcolor=#E9E9E9
| 131146 ||  || — || January 29, 2001 || Haleakala || NEAT || — || align=right | 3.1 km || 
|-id=147 bgcolor=#E9E9E9
| 131147 ||  || — || January 31, 2001 || Haleakala || NEAT || — || align=right | 2.6 km || 
|-id=148 bgcolor=#E9E9E9
| 131148 ||  || — || January 21, 2001 || Socorro || LINEAR || — || align=right | 2.5 km || 
|-id=149 bgcolor=#E9E9E9
| 131149 ||  || — || January 21, 2001 || Socorro || LINEAR || — || align=right | 2.5 km || 
|-id=150 bgcolor=#E9E9E9
| 131150 ||  || — || January 31, 2001 || Socorro || LINEAR || EUN || align=right | 2.7 km || 
|-id=151 bgcolor=#E9E9E9
| 131151 ||  || — || February 1, 2001 || Socorro || LINEAR || NEM || align=right | 4.0 km || 
|-id=152 bgcolor=#E9E9E9
| 131152 ||  || — || February 1, 2001 || Socorro || LINEAR || — || align=right | 2.7 km || 
|-id=153 bgcolor=#E9E9E9
| 131153 ||  || — || February 2, 2001 || Oaxaca || J. M. Roe || — || align=right | 3.5 km || 
|-id=154 bgcolor=#E9E9E9
| 131154 ||  || — || February 3, 2001 || Piera || J. Guarro i Fló || — || align=right | 2.7 km || 
|-id=155 bgcolor=#E9E9E9
| 131155 ||  || — || February 2, 2001 || Farpoint || G. Hug || — || align=right | 2.5 km || 
|-id=156 bgcolor=#E9E9E9
| 131156 ||  || — || February 1, 2001 || Socorro || LINEAR || — || align=right | 4.2 km || 
|-id=157 bgcolor=#d6d6d6
| 131157 ||  || — || February 1, 2001 || Socorro || LINEAR || — || align=right | 4.5 km || 
|-id=158 bgcolor=#d6d6d6
| 131158 ||  || — || February 2, 2001 || Socorro || LINEAR || — || align=right | 4.4 km || 
|-id=159 bgcolor=#E9E9E9
| 131159 ||  || — || February 2, 2001 || Socorro || LINEAR || — || align=right | 5.1 km || 
|-id=160 bgcolor=#E9E9E9
| 131160 ||  || — || February 1, 2001 || Anderson Mesa || LONEOS || — || align=right | 4.7 km || 
|-id=161 bgcolor=#E9E9E9
| 131161 ||  || — || February 1, 2001 || Anderson Mesa || LONEOS || ADE || align=right | 6.2 km || 
|-id=162 bgcolor=#E9E9E9
| 131162 ||  || — || February 1, 2001 || Anderson Mesa || LONEOS || — || align=right | 4.1 km || 
|-id=163 bgcolor=#E9E9E9
| 131163 ||  || — || February 1, 2001 || Kitt Peak || Spacewatch || — || align=right | 2.8 km || 
|-id=164 bgcolor=#E9E9E9
| 131164 ||  || — || February 2, 2001 || Anderson Mesa || LONEOS || — || align=right | 2.1 km || 
|-id=165 bgcolor=#E9E9E9
| 131165 ||  || — || February 2, 2001 || Anderson Mesa || LONEOS || PAE || align=right | 5.0 km || 
|-id=166 bgcolor=#E9E9E9
| 131166 ||  || — || February 2, 2001 || Socorro || LINEAR || — || align=right | 3.0 km || 
|-id=167 bgcolor=#E9E9E9
| 131167 ||  || — || February 3, 2001 || Socorro || LINEAR || — || align=right | 2.2 km || 
|-id=168 bgcolor=#E9E9E9
| 131168 ||  || — || February 13, 2001 || Socorro || LINEAR || EUN || align=right | 2.6 km || 
|-id=169 bgcolor=#E9E9E9
| 131169 ||  || — || February 13, 2001 || Socorro || LINEAR || — || align=right | 4.8 km || 
|-id=170 bgcolor=#E9E9E9
| 131170 ||  || — || February 13, 2001 || Socorro || LINEAR || — || align=right | 4.0 km || 
|-id=171 bgcolor=#E9E9E9
| 131171 ||  || — || February 15, 2001 || Oizumi || T. Kobayashi || — || align=right | 2.5 km || 
|-id=172 bgcolor=#E9E9E9
| 131172 ||  || — || February 15, 2001 || Socorro || LINEAR || HNS || align=right | 2.3 km || 
|-id=173 bgcolor=#E9E9E9
| 131173 ||  || — || February 13, 2001 || Socorro || LINEAR || — || align=right | 4.4 km || 
|-id=174 bgcolor=#E9E9E9
| 131174 ||  || — || February 13, 2001 || Socorro || LINEAR || — || align=right | 2.2 km || 
|-id=175 bgcolor=#E9E9E9
| 131175 ||  || — || February 13, 2001 || Socorro || LINEAR || DOR || align=right | 3.8 km || 
|-id=176 bgcolor=#E9E9E9
| 131176 ||  || — || February 13, 2001 || Socorro || LINEAR || — || align=right | 2.8 km || 
|-id=177 bgcolor=#E9E9E9
| 131177 ||  || — || February 13, 2001 || Socorro || LINEAR || — || align=right | 4.3 km || 
|-id=178 bgcolor=#E9E9E9
| 131178 ||  || — || February 13, 2001 || Socorro || LINEAR || — || align=right | 2.8 km || 
|-id=179 bgcolor=#E9E9E9
| 131179 ||  || — || February 15, 2001 || Socorro || LINEAR || MAR || align=right | 2.2 km || 
|-id=180 bgcolor=#d6d6d6
| 131180 ||  || — || February 15, 2001 || Črni Vrh || Črni Vrh || — || align=right | 5.0 km || 
|-id=181 bgcolor=#E9E9E9
| 131181 Žebrák ||  ||  || February 15, 2001 || Ondřejov || P. Pravec, L. Kotková || WIT || align=right | 1.7 km || 
|-id=182 bgcolor=#E9E9E9
| 131182 ||  || — || February 15, 2001 || Socorro || LINEAR || HNS || align=right | 2.7 km || 
|-id=183 bgcolor=#E9E9E9
| 131183 ||  || — || February 15, 2001 || Socorro || LINEAR || — || align=right | 2.4 km || 
|-id=184 bgcolor=#E9E9E9
| 131184 ||  || — || February 15, 2001 || Socorro || LINEAR || — || align=right | 3.2 km || 
|-id=185 bgcolor=#E9E9E9
| 131185 ||  || — || February 13, 2001 || Socorro || LINEAR || — || align=right | 3.7 km || 
|-id=186 bgcolor=#E9E9E9
| 131186 Pauluckas || 2001 DS ||  || February 16, 2001 || Nogales || P. R. Holvorcem, M. Schwartz || — || align=right | 3.7 km || 
|-id=187 bgcolor=#E9E9E9
| 131187 || 2001 DW || — || February 16, 2001 || Nogales || Tenagra II Obs. || — || align=right | 2.3 km || 
|-id=188 bgcolor=#E9E9E9
| 131188 ||  || — || February 16, 2001 || Kitt Peak || Spacewatch || AER || align=right | 2.6 km || 
|-id=189 bgcolor=#fefefe
| 131189 ||  || — || February 16, 2001 || Socorro || LINEAR || — || align=right | 2.0 km || 
|-id=190 bgcolor=#E9E9E9
| 131190 ||  || — || February 16, 2001 || Socorro || LINEAR || — || align=right | 2.5 km || 
|-id=191 bgcolor=#E9E9E9
| 131191 ||  || — || February 17, 2001 || Farpoint || Farpoint Obs. || — || align=right | 2.8 km || 
|-id=192 bgcolor=#E9E9E9
| 131192 ||  || — || February 16, 2001 || Oizumi || T. Kobayashi || — || align=right | 4.6 km || 
|-id=193 bgcolor=#E9E9E9
| 131193 ||  || — || February 17, 2001 || Nogales || Tenagra II Obs. || XIZ || align=right | 2.6 km || 
|-id=194 bgcolor=#E9E9E9
| 131194 ||  || — || February 16, 2001 || Socorro || LINEAR || — || align=right | 4.0 km || 
|-id=195 bgcolor=#E9E9E9
| 131195 ||  || — || February 17, 2001 || Socorro || LINEAR || DOR || align=right | 4.5 km || 
|-id=196 bgcolor=#E9E9E9
| 131196 ||  || — || February 16, 2001 || Socorro || LINEAR || — || align=right | 3.7 km || 
|-id=197 bgcolor=#E9E9E9
| 131197 ||  || — || February 16, 2001 || Socorro || LINEAR || — || align=right | 4.0 km || 
|-id=198 bgcolor=#E9E9E9
| 131198 ||  || — || February 16, 2001 || Socorro || LINEAR || — || align=right | 2.4 km || 
|-id=199 bgcolor=#E9E9E9
| 131199 ||  || — || February 17, 2001 || Socorro || LINEAR || MRX || align=right | 2.1 km || 
|-id=200 bgcolor=#E9E9E9
| 131200 ||  || — || February 17, 2001 || Socorro || LINEAR || MRX || align=right | 2.5 km || 
|}

131201–131300 

|-bgcolor=#E9E9E9
| 131201 ||  || — || February 17, 2001 || Socorro || LINEAR || — || align=right | 3.1 km || 
|-id=202 bgcolor=#E9E9E9
| 131202 ||  || — || February 17, 2001 || Socorro || LINEAR || — || align=right | 4.3 km || 
|-id=203 bgcolor=#E9E9E9
| 131203 ||  || — || February 17, 2001 || Socorro || LINEAR || WIT || align=right | 2.3 km || 
|-id=204 bgcolor=#E9E9E9
| 131204 ||  || — || February 17, 2001 || Socorro || LINEAR || — || align=right | 1.9 km || 
|-id=205 bgcolor=#E9E9E9
| 131205 ||  || — || February 19, 2001 || Socorro || LINEAR || — || align=right | 3.0 km || 
|-id=206 bgcolor=#E9E9E9
| 131206 ||  || — || February 19, 2001 || Socorro || LINEAR || — || align=right | 3.7 km || 
|-id=207 bgcolor=#E9E9E9
| 131207 ||  || — || February 19, 2001 || Socorro || LINEAR || — || align=right | 4.7 km || 
|-id=208 bgcolor=#E9E9E9
| 131208 ||  || — || February 16, 2001 || Socorro || LINEAR || NEM || align=right | 4.5 km || 
|-id=209 bgcolor=#E9E9E9
| 131209 ||  || — || February 16, 2001 || Socorro || LINEAR || — || align=right | 2.7 km || 
|-id=210 bgcolor=#E9E9E9
| 131210 ||  || — || February 16, 2001 || Socorro || LINEAR || — || align=right | 1.8 km || 
|-id=211 bgcolor=#E9E9E9
| 131211 ||  || — || February 16, 2001 || Socorro || LINEAR || — || align=right | 2.4 km || 
|-id=212 bgcolor=#E9E9E9
| 131212 ||  || — || February 16, 2001 || Socorro || LINEAR || — || align=right | 3.8 km || 
|-id=213 bgcolor=#E9E9E9
| 131213 ||  || — || February 16, 2001 || Socorro || LINEAR || — || align=right | 4.8 km || 
|-id=214 bgcolor=#E9E9E9
| 131214 ||  || — || February 19, 2001 || Socorro || LINEAR || HEN || align=right | 3.7 km || 
|-id=215 bgcolor=#E9E9E9
| 131215 ||  || — || February 19, 2001 || Socorro || LINEAR || — || align=right | 2.9 km || 
|-id=216 bgcolor=#E9E9E9
| 131216 ||  || — || February 19, 2001 || Socorro || LINEAR || — || align=right | 1.8 km || 
|-id=217 bgcolor=#E9E9E9
| 131217 ||  || — || February 19, 2001 || Socorro || LINEAR || EUN || align=right | 2.4 km || 
|-id=218 bgcolor=#E9E9E9
| 131218 ||  || — || February 19, 2001 || Socorro || LINEAR || — || align=right | 4.2 km || 
|-id=219 bgcolor=#d6d6d6
| 131219 ||  || — || February 21, 2001 || Socorro || LINEAR || — || align=right | 5.4 km || 
|-id=220 bgcolor=#E9E9E9
| 131220 ||  || — || February 22, 2001 || Kitt Peak || Spacewatch || AST || align=right | 4.5 km || 
|-id=221 bgcolor=#E9E9E9
| 131221 ||  || — || February 22, 2001 || Nogales || Tenagra II Obs. || GEF || align=right | 2.0 km || 
|-id=222 bgcolor=#E9E9E9
| 131222 ||  || — || February 22, 2001 || Kitt Peak || Spacewatch || — || align=right | 3.4 km || 
|-id=223 bgcolor=#E9E9E9
| 131223 ||  || — || February 20, 2001 || Kitt Peak || Spacewatch || DOR || align=right | 5.0 km || 
|-id=224 bgcolor=#E9E9E9
| 131224 ||  || — || February 19, 2001 || Anderson Mesa || LONEOS || — || align=right | 4.3 km || 
|-id=225 bgcolor=#E9E9E9
| 131225 ||  || — || February 19, 2001 || Anderson Mesa || LONEOS || — || align=right | 2.5 km || 
|-id=226 bgcolor=#E9E9E9
| 131226 ||  || — || February 19, 2001 || Socorro || LINEAR || DOR || align=right | 5.0 km || 
|-id=227 bgcolor=#E9E9E9
| 131227 ||  || — || February 17, 2001 || Socorro || LINEAR || — || align=right | 4.5 km || 
|-id=228 bgcolor=#E9E9E9
| 131228 ||  || — || February 17, 2001 || Socorro || LINEAR || — || align=right | 3.2 km || 
|-id=229 bgcolor=#E9E9E9
| 131229 ||  || — || February 16, 2001 || Socorro || LINEAR || ADE || align=right | 4.9 km || 
|-id=230 bgcolor=#E9E9E9
| 131230 ||  || — || February 16, 2001 || Socorro || LINEAR || — || align=right | 4.1 km || 
|-id=231 bgcolor=#E9E9E9
| 131231 ||  || — || February 16, 2001 || Socorro || LINEAR || — || align=right | 4.7 km || 
|-id=232 bgcolor=#E9E9E9
| 131232 ||  || — || February 16, 2001 || Socorro || LINEAR || GEF || align=right | 2.6 km || 
|-id=233 bgcolor=#E9E9E9
| 131233 ||  || — || February 16, 2001 || Anderson Mesa || LONEOS || — || align=right | 2.8 km || 
|-id=234 bgcolor=#E9E9E9
| 131234 ||  || — || February 22, 2001 || Kitt Peak || Spacewatch || ADE || align=right | 4.8 km || 
|-id=235 bgcolor=#d6d6d6
| 131235 ||  || — || February 17, 2001 || Kitt Peak || Spacewatch || — || align=right | 3.3 km || 
|-id=236 bgcolor=#E9E9E9
| 131236 || 2001 ER || — || March 4, 2001 || Oaxaca || J. M. Roe || — || align=right | 2.3 km || 
|-id=237 bgcolor=#E9E9E9
| 131237 ||  || — || March 1, 2001 || Socorro || LINEAR || — || align=right | 4.4 km || 
|-id=238 bgcolor=#E9E9E9
| 131238 ||  || — || March 1, 2001 || Socorro || LINEAR || — || align=right | 4.6 km || 
|-id=239 bgcolor=#E9E9E9
| 131239 ||  || — || March 1, 2001 || Socorro || LINEAR || ADE || align=right | 5.1 km || 
|-id=240 bgcolor=#E9E9E9
| 131240 ||  || — || March 2, 2001 || Anderson Mesa || LONEOS || — || align=right | 3.4 km || 
|-id=241 bgcolor=#E9E9E9
| 131241 ||  || — || March 2, 2001 || Anderson Mesa || LONEOS || — || align=right | 4.8 km || 
|-id=242 bgcolor=#E9E9E9
| 131242 ||  || — || March 2, 2001 || Anderson Mesa || LONEOS || — || align=right | 2.6 km || 
|-id=243 bgcolor=#E9E9E9
| 131243 ||  || — || March 15, 2001 || Socorro || LINEAR || — || align=right | 1.9 km || 
|-id=244 bgcolor=#E9E9E9
| 131244 || 2001 FD || — || March 18, 2001 || Oizumi || T. Kobayashi || DOR || align=right | 4.1 km || 
|-id=245 bgcolor=#E9E9E9
| 131245 Bakich ||  ||  || March 16, 2001 || Junk Bond || D. Healy || HOF || align=right | 5.0 km || 
|-id=246 bgcolor=#E9E9E9
| 131246 ||  || — || March 16, 2001 || Kitt Peak || Spacewatch || — || align=right | 2.6 km || 
|-id=247 bgcolor=#d6d6d6
| 131247 ||  || — || March 19, 2001 || Prescott || P. G. Comba || — || align=right | 5.7 km || 
|-id=248 bgcolor=#E9E9E9
| 131248 ||  || — || March 19, 2001 || Socorro || LINEAR || — || align=right | 2.6 km || 
|-id=249 bgcolor=#E9E9E9
| 131249 ||  || — || March 19, 2001 || Anderson Mesa || LONEOS || — || align=right | 3.3 km || 
|-id=250 bgcolor=#d6d6d6
| 131250 ||  || — || March 19, 2001 || Anderson Mesa || LONEOS || KOR || align=right | 2.4 km || 
|-id=251 bgcolor=#d6d6d6
| 131251 ||  || — || March 19, 2001 || Anderson Mesa || LONEOS || — || align=right | 5.4 km || 
|-id=252 bgcolor=#E9E9E9
| 131252 ||  || — || March 19, 2001 || Anderson Mesa || LONEOS || — || align=right | 2.3 km || 
|-id=253 bgcolor=#E9E9E9
| 131253 ||  || — || March 19, 2001 || Anderson Mesa || LONEOS || — || align=right | 4.7 km || 
|-id=254 bgcolor=#d6d6d6
| 131254 ||  || — || March 19, 2001 || Anderson Mesa || LONEOS || EOS || align=right | 4.2 km || 
|-id=255 bgcolor=#d6d6d6
| 131255 ||  || — || March 21, 2001 || Anderson Mesa || LONEOS || — || align=right | 3.9 km || 
|-id=256 bgcolor=#E9E9E9
| 131256 ||  || — || March 18, 2001 || Socorro || LINEAR || — || align=right | 4.7 km || 
|-id=257 bgcolor=#d6d6d6
| 131257 ||  || — || March 19, 2001 || Socorro || LINEAR || — || align=right | 8.2 km || 
|-id=258 bgcolor=#E9E9E9
| 131258 ||  || — || March 20, 2001 || Haleakala || NEAT || — || align=right | 4.6 km || 
|-id=259 bgcolor=#d6d6d6
| 131259 ||  || — || March 20, 2001 || Haleakala || NEAT || NAE || align=right | 5.9 km || 
|-id=260 bgcolor=#E9E9E9
| 131260 ||  || — || March 17, 2001 || Socorro || LINEAR || 526 || align=right | 4.8 km || 
|-id=261 bgcolor=#d6d6d6
| 131261 ||  || — || March 18, 2001 || Socorro || LINEAR || THM || align=right | 4.3 km || 
|-id=262 bgcolor=#E9E9E9
| 131262 ||  || — || March 18, 2001 || Socorro || LINEAR || — || align=right | 5.5 km || 
|-id=263 bgcolor=#fefefe
| 131263 ||  || — || March 18, 2001 || Socorro || LINEAR || — || align=right | 3.0 km || 
|-id=264 bgcolor=#E9E9E9
| 131264 ||  || — || March 18, 2001 || Socorro || LINEAR || — || align=right | 3.4 km || 
|-id=265 bgcolor=#d6d6d6
| 131265 ||  || — || March 18, 2001 || Socorro || LINEAR || — || align=right | 3.6 km || 
|-id=266 bgcolor=#E9E9E9
| 131266 ||  || — || March 18, 2001 || Socorro || LINEAR || — || align=right | 2.2 km || 
|-id=267 bgcolor=#d6d6d6
| 131267 ||  || — || March 18, 2001 || Socorro || LINEAR || — || align=right | 4.6 km || 
|-id=268 bgcolor=#E9E9E9
| 131268 ||  || — || March 18, 2001 || Socorro || LINEAR || — || align=right | 4.7 km || 
|-id=269 bgcolor=#d6d6d6
| 131269 ||  || — || March 18, 2001 || Socorro || LINEAR || — || align=right | 4.1 km || 
|-id=270 bgcolor=#E9E9E9
| 131270 ||  || — || March 19, 2001 || Socorro || LINEAR || — || align=right | 4.0 km || 
|-id=271 bgcolor=#E9E9E9
| 131271 ||  || — || March 19, 2001 || Socorro || LINEAR || — || align=right | 3.3 km || 
|-id=272 bgcolor=#d6d6d6
| 131272 ||  || — || March 19, 2001 || Socorro || LINEAR || KOR || align=right | 3.0 km || 
|-id=273 bgcolor=#E9E9E9
| 131273 ||  || — || March 19, 2001 || Socorro || LINEAR || GEF || align=right | 3.1 km || 
|-id=274 bgcolor=#d6d6d6
| 131274 ||  || — || March 19, 2001 || Socorro || LINEAR || — || align=right | 5.2 km || 
|-id=275 bgcolor=#E9E9E9
| 131275 ||  || — || March 19, 2001 || Socorro || LINEAR || CLO || align=right | 3.2 km || 
|-id=276 bgcolor=#E9E9E9
| 131276 ||  || — || March 19, 2001 || Socorro || LINEAR || — || align=right | 5.9 km || 
|-id=277 bgcolor=#d6d6d6
| 131277 ||  || — || March 19, 2001 || Socorro || LINEAR || KAR || align=right | 2.3 km || 
|-id=278 bgcolor=#d6d6d6
| 131278 ||  || — || March 19, 2001 || Socorro || LINEAR || — || align=right | 5.7 km || 
|-id=279 bgcolor=#d6d6d6
| 131279 ||  || — || March 19, 2001 || Socorro || LINEAR || TRP || align=right | 4.8 km || 
|-id=280 bgcolor=#E9E9E9
| 131280 ||  || — || March 23, 2001 || Socorro || LINEAR || — || align=right | 4.6 km || 
|-id=281 bgcolor=#E9E9E9
| 131281 ||  || — || March 16, 2001 || Socorro || LINEAR || — || align=right | 3.3 km || 
|-id=282 bgcolor=#E9E9E9
| 131282 ||  || — || March 16, 2001 || Socorro || LINEAR || — || align=right | 2.3 km || 
|-id=283 bgcolor=#d6d6d6
| 131283 ||  || — || March 16, 2001 || Socorro || LINEAR || MEL || align=right | 7.4 km || 
|-id=284 bgcolor=#d6d6d6
| 131284 ||  || — || March 16, 2001 || Socorro || LINEAR || CHA || align=right | 3.9 km || 
|-id=285 bgcolor=#E9E9E9
| 131285 ||  || — || March 18, 2001 || Anderson Mesa || LONEOS || — || align=right | 3.3 km || 
|-id=286 bgcolor=#E9E9E9
| 131286 ||  || — || March 18, 2001 || Anderson Mesa || LONEOS || — || align=right | 4.1 km || 
|-id=287 bgcolor=#E9E9E9
| 131287 ||  || — || March 18, 2001 || Anderson Mesa || LONEOS || — || align=right | 2.9 km || 
|-id=288 bgcolor=#E9E9E9
| 131288 ||  || — || March 18, 2001 || Anderson Mesa || LONEOS || — || align=right | 3.5 km || 
|-id=289 bgcolor=#E9E9E9
| 131289 ||  || — || March 18, 2001 || Anderson Mesa || LONEOS || HOF || align=right | 6.0 km || 
|-id=290 bgcolor=#d6d6d6
| 131290 ||  || — || March 18, 2001 || Socorro || LINEAR || — || align=right | 3.6 km || 
|-id=291 bgcolor=#d6d6d6
| 131291 ||  || — || March 18, 2001 || Socorro || LINEAR || KOR || align=right | 2.9 km || 
|-id=292 bgcolor=#E9E9E9
| 131292 ||  || — || March 18, 2001 || Socorro || LINEAR || — || align=right | 6.3 km || 
|-id=293 bgcolor=#E9E9E9
| 131293 ||  || — || March 18, 2001 || Haleakala || NEAT || WIT || align=right | 2.0 km || 
|-id=294 bgcolor=#d6d6d6
| 131294 ||  || — || March 19, 2001 || Anderson Mesa || LONEOS || — || align=right | 3.8 km || 
|-id=295 bgcolor=#d6d6d6
| 131295 ||  || — || March 26, 2001 || Socorro || LINEAR || EUP || align=right | 7.6 km || 
|-id=296 bgcolor=#E9E9E9
| 131296 ||  || — || March 23, 2001 || Haleakala || NEAT || — || align=right | 3.6 km || 
|-id=297 bgcolor=#d6d6d6
| 131297 ||  || — || March 29, 2001 || Anderson Mesa || LONEOS || EOS || align=right | 3.7 km || 
|-id=298 bgcolor=#d6d6d6
| 131298 ||  || — || March 29, 2001 || Anderson Mesa || LONEOS || LAU || align=right | 1.7 km || 
|-id=299 bgcolor=#d6d6d6
| 131299 ||  || — || March 30, 2001 || Anderson Mesa || LONEOS || Tj (2.95) || align=right | 3.3 km || 
|-id=300 bgcolor=#E9E9E9
| 131300 ||  || — || March 20, 2001 || Haleakala || NEAT || AGN || align=right | 2.2 km || 
|}

131301–131400 

|-bgcolor=#d6d6d6
| 131301 ||  || — || March 21, 2001 || Haleakala || NEAT || — || align=right | 4.7 km || 
|-id=302 bgcolor=#E9E9E9
| 131302 ||  || — || March 23, 2001 || Kitt Peak || Spacewatch || — || align=right | 4.5 km || 
|-id=303 bgcolor=#E9E9E9
| 131303 ||  || — || March 23, 2001 || Haleakala || NEAT || — || align=right | 2.9 km || 
|-id=304 bgcolor=#E9E9E9
| 131304 ||  || — || March 23, 2001 || Haleakala || NEAT || JUN || align=right | 2.3 km || 
|-id=305 bgcolor=#d6d6d6
| 131305 ||  || — || March 23, 2001 || Haleakala || NEAT || TIR || align=right | 6.0 km || 
|-id=306 bgcolor=#E9E9E9
| 131306 ||  || — || March 26, 2001 || Socorro || LINEAR || — || align=right | 3.9 km || 
|-id=307 bgcolor=#d6d6d6
| 131307 ||  || — || March 27, 2001 || Anderson Mesa || LONEOS || CHA || align=right | 5.1 km || 
|-id=308 bgcolor=#fefefe
| 131308 ||  || — || March 26, 2001 || Socorro || LINEAR || NYS || align=right | 1.1 km || 
|-id=309 bgcolor=#E9E9E9
| 131309 ||  || — || March 27, 2001 || Haleakala || NEAT || DOR || align=right | 2.9 km || 
|-id=310 bgcolor=#E9E9E9
| 131310 ||  || — || March 29, 2001 || Anderson Mesa || LONEOS || — || align=right | 2.3 km || 
|-id=311 bgcolor=#d6d6d6
| 131311 ||  || — || March 29, 2001 || Anderson Mesa || LONEOS || — || align=right | 4.0 km || 
|-id=312 bgcolor=#E9E9E9
| 131312 ||  || — || March 29, 2001 || Haleakala || NEAT || — || align=right | 4.0 km || 
|-id=313 bgcolor=#E9E9E9
| 131313 ||  || — || March 24, 2001 || Haleakala || NEAT || — || align=right | 2.4 km || 
|-id=314 bgcolor=#d6d6d6
| 131314 ||  || — || March 21, 2001 || Kitt Peak || Spacewatch || — || align=right | 4.5 km || 
|-id=315 bgcolor=#d6d6d6
| 131315 ||  || — || March 18, 2001 || Kitt Peak || Spacewatch || — || align=right | 2.2 km || 
|-id=316 bgcolor=#d6d6d6
| 131316 ||  || — || March 20, 2001 || Anderson Mesa || LONEOS || — || align=right | 4.6 km || 
|-id=317 bgcolor=#E9E9E9
| 131317 ||  || — || March 20, 2001 || Anderson Mesa || LONEOS || — || align=right | 2.4 km || 
|-id=318 bgcolor=#C2E0FF
| 131318 ||  || — || March 22, 2001 || Kitt Peak || Kitt Peak Obs. || plutinocritical || align=right | 122 km || 
|-id=319 bgcolor=#E9E9E9
| 131319 ||  || — || April 15, 2001 || Socorro || LINEAR || EUN || align=right | 3.0 km || 
|-id=320 bgcolor=#d6d6d6
| 131320 ||  || — || April 15, 2001 || Socorro || LINEAR || — || align=right | 4.6 km || 
|-id=321 bgcolor=#d6d6d6
| 131321 ||  || — || April 15, 2001 || Kitt Peak || Spacewatch || EOS || align=right | 3.6 km || 
|-id=322 bgcolor=#d6d6d6
| 131322 ||  || — || April 15, 2001 || Socorro || LINEAR || EMA || align=right | 7.4 km || 
|-id=323 bgcolor=#d6d6d6
| 131323 ||  || — || April 15, 2001 || Haleakala || NEAT || — || align=right | 4.9 km || 
|-id=324 bgcolor=#fefefe
| 131324 ||  || — || April 21, 2001 || Socorro || LINEAR || H || align=right data-sort-value="0.89" | 890 m || 
|-id=325 bgcolor=#d6d6d6
| 131325 ||  || — || April 16, 2001 || Socorro || LINEAR || — || align=right | 6.4 km || 
|-id=326 bgcolor=#d6d6d6
| 131326 ||  || — || April 21, 2001 || Socorro || LINEAR || EUP || align=right | 7.3 km || 
|-id=327 bgcolor=#d6d6d6
| 131327 ||  || — || April 27, 2001 || Emerald Lane || L. Ball || — || align=right | 3.3 km || 
|-id=328 bgcolor=#E9E9E9
| 131328 ||  || — || April 23, 2001 || Kitt Peak || Spacewatch || HOF || align=right | 4.3 km || 
|-id=329 bgcolor=#d6d6d6
| 131329 ||  || — || April 27, 2001 || Kitt Peak || Spacewatch || — || align=right | 5.8 km || 
|-id=330 bgcolor=#d6d6d6
| 131330 ||  || — || April 27, 2001 || Desert Beaver || W. K. Y. Yeung || — || align=right | 9.3 km || 
|-id=331 bgcolor=#d6d6d6
| 131331 ||  || — || April 27, 2001 || Desert Beaver || W. K. Y. Yeung || — || align=right | 6.9 km || 
|-id=332 bgcolor=#fefefe
| 131332 ||  || — || April 27, 2001 || Socorro || LINEAR || H || align=right | 1.8 km || 
|-id=333 bgcolor=#d6d6d6
| 131333 ||  || — || April 28, 2001 || Desert Beaver || W. K. Y. Yeung || TIR || align=right | 5.0 km || 
|-id=334 bgcolor=#d6d6d6
| 131334 ||  || — || April 27, 2001 || Socorro || LINEAR || — || align=right | 4.6 km || 
|-id=335 bgcolor=#E9E9E9
| 131335 ||  || — || April 27, 2001 || Socorro || LINEAR || — || align=right | 3.4 km || 
|-id=336 bgcolor=#d6d6d6
| 131336 ||  || — || April 29, 2001 || Socorro || LINEAR || — || align=right | 6.4 km || 
|-id=337 bgcolor=#d6d6d6
| 131337 ||  || — || April 29, 2001 || Socorro || LINEAR || — || align=right | 4.9 km || 
|-id=338 bgcolor=#d6d6d6
| 131338 ||  || — || April 16, 2001 || Kitt Peak || Spacewatch || — || align=right | 6.2 km || 
|-id=339 bgcolor=#d6d6d6
| 131339 ||  || — || April 16, 2001 || Anderson Mesa || LONEOS || — || align=right | 4.3 km || 
|-id=340 bgcolor=#d6d6d6
| 131340 ||  || — || April 16, 2001 || Anderson Mesa || LONEOS || — || align=right | 7.1 km || 
|-id=341 bgcolor=#d6d6d6
| 131341 ||  || — || April 18, 2001 || Haleakala || NEAT || — || align=right | 4.3 km || 
|-id=342 bgcolor=#E9E9E9
| 131342 ||  || — || April 21, 2001 || Socorro || LINEAR || ADE || align=right | 5.7 km || 
|-id=343 bgcolor=#d6d6d6
| 131343 ||  || — || April 24, 2001 || Anderson Mesa || LONEOS || — || align=right | 7.0 km || 
|-id=344 bgcolor=#d6d6d6
| 131344 ||  || — || April 24, 2001 || Socorro || LINEAR || — || align=right | 6.2 km || 
|-id=345 bgcolor=#d6d6d6
| 131345 ||  || — || April 24, 2001 || Socorro || LINEAR || — || align=right | 5.4 km || 
|-id=346 bgcolor=#d6d6d6
| 131346 ||  || — || April 24, 2001 || Haleakala || NEAT || — || align=right | 4.4 km || 
|-id=347 bgcolor=#E9E9E9
| 131347 ||  || — || April 25, 2001 || Anderson Mesa || LONEOS || GEF || align=right | 3.3 km || 
|-id=348 bgcolor=#E9E9E9
| 131348 ||  || — || April 21, 2001 || Socorro || LINEAR || — || align=right | 6.0 km || 
|-id=349 bgcolor=#d6d6d6
| 131349 ||  || — || April 23, 2001 || Socorro || LINEAR || — || align=right | 4.5 km || 
|-id=350 bgcolor=#d6d6d6
| 131350 ||  || — || April 27, 2001 || Socorro || LINEAR || — || align=right | 5.8 km || 
|-id=351 bgcolor=#E9E9E9
| 131351 || 2001 JE || — || May 2, 2001 || Reedy Creek || J. Broughton || GEF || align=right | 3.0 km || 
|-id=352 bgcolor=#d6d6d6
| 131352 ||  || — || May 11, 2001 || Ondřejov || L. Kotková || HYG || align=right | 6.5 km || 
|-id=353 bgcolor=#d6d6d6
| 131353 ||  || — || May 15, 2001 || Kitt Peak || Spacewatch || URS || align=right | 7.5 km || 
|-id=354 bgcolor=#d6d6d6
| 131354 ||  || — || May 15, 2001 || Kitt Peak || Spacewatch || — || align=right | 4.8 km || 
|-id=355 bgcolor=#d6d6d6
| 131355 ||  || — || May 15, 2001 || Haleakala || NEAT || EOS || align=right | 4.5 km || 
|-id=356 bgcolor=#d6d6d6
| 131356 ||  || — || May 15, 2001 || Haleakala || NEAT || NAE || align=right | 5.7 km || 
|-id=357 bgcolor=#d6d6d6
| 131357 ||  || — || May 15, 2001 || Anderson Mesa || LONEOS || — || align=right | 5.5 km || 
|-id=358 bgcolor=#d6d6d6
| 131358 ||  || — || May 19, 2001 || Ondřejov || P. Pravec, P. Kušnirák || — || align=right | 4.7 km || 
|-id=359 bgcolor=#E9E9E9
| 131359 ||  || — || May 17, 2001 || Haleakala || NEAT || — || align=right | 2.7 km || 
|-id=360 bgcolor=#d6d6d6
| 131360 ||  || — || May 17, 2001 || Socorro || LINEAR || — || align=right | 5.5 km || 
|-id=361 bgcolor=#d6d6d6
| 131361 ||  || — || May 17, 2001 || Socorro || LINEAR || — || align=right | 6.4 km || 
|-id=362 bgcolor=#d6d6d6
| 131362 ||  || — || May 17, 2001 || Socorro || LINEAR || — || align=right | 5.0 km || 
|-id=363 bgcolor=#d6d6d6
| 131363 ||  || — || May 17, 2001 || Socorro || LINEAR || — || align=right | 8.8 km || 
|-id=364 bgcolor=#d6d6d6
| 131364 ||  || — || May 18, 2001 || Socorro || LINEAR || — || align=right | 3.9 km || 
|-id=365 bgcolor=#d6d6d6
| 131365 ||  || — || May 18, 2001 || Socorro || LINEAR || URS || align=right | 8.5 km || 
|-id=366 bgcolor=#d6d6d6
| 131366 ||  || — || May 18, 2001 || Socorro || LINEAR || — || align=right | 5.1 km || 
|-id=367 bgcolor=#d6d6d6
| 131367 ||  || — || May 18, 2001 || Socorro || LINEAR || — || align=right | 6.0 km || 
|-id=368 bgcolor=#d6d6d6
| 131368 ||  || — || May 21, 2001 || Kitt Peak || Spacewatch || — || align=right | 8.1 km || 
|-id=369 bgcolor=#fefefe
| 131369 ||  || — || May 18, 2001 || Socorro || LINEAR || H || align=right data-sort-value="0.95" | 950 m || 
|-id=370 bgcolor=#E9E9E9
| 131370 ||  || — || May 17, 2001 || Socorro || LINEAR || — || align=right | 4.9 km || 
|-id=371 bgcolor=#d6d6d6
| 131371 ||  || — || May 17, 2001 || Socorro || LINEAR || — || align=right | 5.5 km || 
|-id=372 bgcolor=#d6d6d6
| 131372 ||  || — || May 17, 2001 || Socorro || LINEAR || — || align=right | 4.9 km || 
|-id=373 bgcolor=#d6d6d6
| 131373 ||  || — || May 17, 2001 || Socorro || LINEAR || — || align=right | 6.8 km || 
|-id=374 bgcolor=#d6d6d6
| 131374 ||  || — || May 21, 2001 || Socorro || LINEAR || — || align=right | 4.9 km || 
|-id=375 bgcolor=#d6d6d6
| 131375 ||  || — || May 21, 2001 || Socorro || LINEAR || — || align=right | 7.1 km || 
|-id=376 bgcolor=#d6d6d6
| 131376 ||  || — || May 23, 2001 || Socorro || LINEAR || EUP || align=right | 8.2 km || 
|-id=377 bgcolor=#d6d6d6
| 131377 ||  || — || May 18, 2001 || Socorro || LINEAR || VER || align=right | 7.5 km || 
|-id=378 bgcolor=#d6d6d6
| 131378 ||  || — || May 18, 2001 || Socorro || LINEAR || — || align=right | 7.9 km || 
|-id=379 bgcolor=#d6d6d6
| 131379 ||  || — || May 22, 2001 || Socorro || LINEAR || TIR || align=right | 5.4 km || 
|-id=380 bgcolor=#d6d6d6
| 131380 ||  || — || May 22, 2001 || Socorro || LINEAR || — || align=right | 4.9 km || 
|-id=381 bgcolor=#d6d6d6
| 131381 ||  || — || May 22, 2001 || Socorro || LINEAR || slow || align=right | 10 km || 
|-id=382 bgcolor=#d6d6d6
| 131382 ||  || — || May 22, 2001 || Socorro || LINEAR || — || align=right | 9.6 km || 
|-id=383 bgcolor=#d6d6d6
| 131383 ||  || — || May 22, 2001 || Socorro || LINEAR || — || align=right | 7.5 km || 
|-id=384 bgcolor=#fefefe
| 131384 ||  || — || May 23, 2001 || Socorro || LINEAR || H || align=right | 1.5 km || 
|-id=385 bgcolor=#d6d6d6
| 131385 ||  || — || May 23, 2001 || Socorro || LINEAR || — || align=right | 8.3 km || 
|-id=386 bgcolor=#d6d6d6
| 131386 ||  || — || May 22, 2001 || Socorro || LINEAR || — || align=right | 6.1 km || 
|-id=387 bgcolor=#d6d6d6
| 131387 ||  || — || May 24, 2001 || Socorro || LINEAR || — || align=right | 9.3 km || 
|-id=388 bgcolor=#E9E9E9
| 131388 ||  || — || May 18, 2001 || Anderson Mesa || LONEOS || — || align=right | 5.7 km || 
|-id=389 bgcolor=#d6d6d6
| 131389 ||  || — || May 18, 2001 || Socorro || LINEAR || EOS || align=right | 4.3 km || 
|-id=390 bgcolor=#E9E9E9
| 131390 ||  || — || May 22, 2001 || Socorro || LINEAR || POS || align=right | 4.7 km || 
|-id=391 bgcolor=#d6d6d6
| 131391 ||  || — || May 22, 2001 || Socorro || LINEAR || URS || align=right | 7.5 km || 
|-id=392 bgcolor=#d6d6d6
| 131392 ||  || — || May 22, 2001 || Socorro || LINEAR || EOS || align=right | 4.9 km || 
|-id=393 bgcolor=#E9E9E9
| 131393 ||  || — || May 23, 2001 || Socorro || LINEAR || — || align=right | 6.4 km || 
|-id=394 bgcolor=#d6d6d6
| 131394 ||  || — || May 26, 2001 || Socorro || LINEAR || — || align=right | 6.4 km || 
|-id=395 bgcolor=#d6d6d6
| 131395 ||  || — || May 18, 2001 || Goodricke-Pigott || R. A. Tucker || — || align=right | 7.9 km || 
|-id=396 bgcolor=#d6d6d6
| 131396 ||  || — || May 18, 2001 || Socorro || LINEAR || EOS || align=right | 3.8 km || 
|-id=397 bgcolor=#d6d6d6
| 131397 ||  || — || May 18, 2001 || Anderson Mesa || LONEOS || — || align=right | 5.9 km || 
|-id=398 bgcolor=#d6d6d6
| 131398 ||  || — || May 22, 2001 || Anderson Mesa || LONEOS || — || align=right | 7.5 km || 
|-id=399 bgcolor=#d6d6d6
| 131399 ||  || — || May 22, 2001 || Anderson Mesa || LONEOS || — || align=right | 6.7 km || 
|-id=400 bgcolor=#d6d6d6
| 131400 ||  || — || May 26, 2001 || Socorro || LINEAR || — || align=right | 11 km || 
|}

131401–131500 

|-bgcolor=#d6d6d6
| 131401 || 2001 LY || — || June 13, 2001 || Socorro || LINEAR || — || align=right | 5.9 km || 
|-id=402 bgcolor=#d6d6d6
| 131402 ||  || — || June 13, 2001 || Socorro || LINEAR || — || align=right | 7.8 km || 
|-id=403 bgcolor=#d6d6d6
| 131403 ||  || — || June 13, 2001 || Socorro || LINEAR || — || align=right | 4.9 km || 
|-id=404 bgcolor=#d6d6d6
| 131404 ||  || — || June 12, 2001 || Haleakala || NEAT || — || align=right | 5.3 km || 
|-id=405 bgcolor=#d6d6d6
| 131405 ||  || — || June 15, 2001 || Palomar || NEAT || — || align=right | 5.4 km || 
|-id=406 bgcolor=#d6d6d6
| 131406 ||  || — || June 15, 2001 || Socorro || LINEAR || URS || align=right | 11 km || 
|-id=407 bgcolor=#d6d6d6
| 131407 ||  || — || June 15, 2001 || Palomar || NEAT || — || align=right | 7.3 km || 
|-id=408 bgcolor=#d6d6d6
| 131408 ||  || — || June 18, 2001 || Socorro || LINEAR || Tj (2.94) || align=right | 8.9 km || 
|-id=409 bgcolor=#d6d6d6
| 131409 ||  || — || June 18, 2001 || Palomar || NEAT || — || align=right | 5.1 km || 
|-id=410 bgcolor=#d6d6d6
| 131410 ||  || — || June 24, 2001 || Desert Beaver || W. K. Y. Yeung || Tj (2.99) || align=right | 8.4 km || 
|-id=411 bgcolor=#fefefe
| 131411 ||  || — || June 21, 2001 || Palomar || NEAT || H || align=right | 1.1 km || 
|-id=412 bgcolor=#d6d6d6
| 131412 ||  || — || June 27, 2001 || Palomar || NEAT || — || align=right | 6.8 km || 
|-id=413 bgcolor=#fefefe
| 131413 || 2001 NT || — || July 8, 2001 || Palomar || NEAT || H || align=right | 1.2 km || 
|-id=414 bgcolor=#d6d6d6
| 131414 ||  || — || July 14, 2001 || Emerald Lane || L. Ball || — || align=right | 5.8 km || 
|-id=415 bgcolor=#fefefe
| 131415 ||  || — || July 13, 2001 || Palomar || NEAT || H || align=right data-sort-value="0.99" | 990 m || 
|-id=416 bgcolor=#d6d6d6
| 131416 || 2001 OA || — || July 16, 2001 || Reedy Creek || J. Broughton || — || align=right | 4.8 km || 
|-id=417 bgcolor=#d6d6d6
| 131417 ||  || — || July 17, 2001 || Anderson Mesa || LONEOS || — || align=right | 9.8 km || 
|-id=418 bgcolor=#d6d6d6
| 131418 ||  || — || July 17, 2001 || Anderson Mesa || LONEOS || — || align=right | 9.6 km || 
|-id=419 bgcolor=#fefefe
| 131419 ||  || — || July 20, 2001 || Socorro || LINEAR || H || align=right | 1.4 km || 
|-id=420 bgcolor=#fefefe
| 131420 ||  || — || July 16, 2001 || Socorro || LINEAR || H || align=right | 1.2 km || 
|-id=421 bgcolor=#d6d6d6
| 131421 ||  || — || July 20, 2001 || Anderson Mesa || LONEOS || 3:2 || align=right | 8.0 km || 
|-id=422 bgcolor=#d6d6d6
| 131422 ||  || — || July 21, 2001 || Haleakala || NEAT || — || align=right | 6.0 km || 
|-id=423 bgcolor=#d6d6d6
| 131423 ||  || — || July 29, 2001 || Ondřejov || Ondřejov Obs. || — || align=right | 6.6 km || 
|-id=424 bgcolor=#d6d6d6
| 131424 ||  || — || July 29, 2001 || Palomar || NEAT || THM || align=right | 4.0 km || 
|-id=425 bgcolor=#d6d6d6
| 131425 ||  || — || July 29, 2001 || Socorro || LINEAR || — || align=right | 7.8 km || 
|-id=426 bgcolor=#d6d6d6
| 131426 ||  || — || July 27, 2001 || Palomar || NEAT || — || align=right | 6.2 km || 
|-id=427 bgcolor=#d6d6d6
| 131427 ||  || — || July 26, 2001 || Palomar || NEAT || — || align=right | 11 km || 
|-id=428 bgcolor=#d6d6d6
| 131428 ||  || — || July 27, 2001 || Anderson Mesa || LONEOS || HYG || align=right | 5.1 km || 
|-id=429 bgcolor=#d6d6d6
| 131429 ||  || — || July 27, 2001 || Haleakala || NEAT || — || align=right | 15 km || 
|-id=430 bgcolor=#d6d6d6
| 131430 ||  || — || July 29, 2001 || Anderson Mesa || LONEOS || — || align=right | 9.2 km || 
|-id=431 bgcolor=#fefefe
| 131431 ||  || — || August 10, 2001 || Palomar || NEAT || H || align=right | 1.2 km || 
|-id=432 bgcolor=#d6d6d6
| 131432 ||  || — || August 11, 2001 || Palomar || NEAT || — || align=right | 5.1 km || 
|-id=433 bgcolor=#d6d6d6
| 131433 ||  || — || August 11, 2001 || Palomar || NEAT || EOS || align=right | 4.6 km || 
|-id=434 bgcolor=#d6d6d6
| 131434 ||  || — || August 11, 2001 || Palomar || NEAT || EOS || align=right | 4.1 km || 
|-id=435 bgcolor=#d6d6d6
| 131435 ||  || — || August 12, 2001 || Palomar || NEAT || — || align=right | 5.8 km || 
|-id=436 bgcolor=#d6d6d6
| 131436 ||  || — || August 16, 2001 || Socorro || LINEAR || — || align=right | 5.6 km || 
|-id=437 bgcolor=#d6d6d6
| 131437 ||  || — || August 16, 2001 || Socorro || LINEAR || — || align=right | 6.1 km || 
|-id=438 bgcolor=#d6d6d6
| 131438 ||  || — || August 16, 2001 || Palomar || NEAT || — || align=right | 8.8 km || 
|-id=439 bgcolor=#fefefe
| 131439 ||  || — || August 20, 2001 || Oakley || C. Wolfe || H || align=right | 1.1 km || 
|-id=440 bgcolor=#d6d6d6
| 131440 ||  || — || August 17, 2001 || Socorro || LINEAR || — || align=right | 8.5 km || 
|-id=441 bgcolor=#fefefe
| 131441 ||  || — || August 17, 2001 || Socorro || LINEAR || PHO || align=right | 2.7 km || 
|-id=442 bgcolor=#d6d6d6
| 131442 ||  || — || August 17, 2001 || Palomar || NEAT || URS || align=right | 8.5 km || 
|-id=443 bgcolor=#d6d6d6
| 131443 ||  || — || August 21, 2001 || Kitt Peak || Spacewatch || 7:4 || align=right | 4.3 km || 
|-id=444 bgcolor=#fefefe
| 131444 ||  || — || August 22, 2001 || Socorro || LINEAR || H || align=right | 1.3 km || 
|-id=445 bgcolor=#fefefe
| 131445 ||  || — || August 22, 2001 || Socorro || LINEAR || H || align=right | 1.4 km || 
|-id=446 bgcolor=#d6d6d6
| 131446 ||  || — || August 24, 2001 || Emerald Lane || L. Ball || TIR || align=right | 6.3 km || 
|-id=447 bgcolor=#C2FFFF
| 131447 ||  || — || August 22, 2001 || Socorro || LINEAR || L5 || align=right | 24 km || 
|-id=448 bgcolor=#d6d6d6
| 131448 ||  || — || August 20, 2001 || Socorro || LINEAR || TEL || align=right | 3.6 km || 
|-id=449 bgcolor=#d6d6d6
| 131449 ||  || — || August 22, 2001 || Socorro || LINEAR || — || align=right | 6.9 km || 
|-id=450 bgcolor=#fefefe
| 131450 ||  || — || August 23, 2001 || Socorro || LINEAR || H || align=right | 1.3 km || 
|-id=451 bgcolor=#C2FFFF
| 131451 ||  || — || August 26, 2001 || Socorro || LINEAR || L5ENM || align=right | 21 km || 
|-id=452 bgcolor=#d6d6d6
| 131452 ||  || — || August 21, 2001 || Kitt Peak || Spacewatch || EOS || align=right | 3.3 km || 
|-id=453 bgcolor=#d6d6d6
| 131453 ||  || — || August 22, 2001 || Socorro || LINEAR || — || align=right | 4.7 km || 
|-id=454 bgcolor=#d6d6d6
| 131454 ||  || — || August 22, 2001 || Socorro || LINEAR || — || align=right | 5.2 km || 
|-id=455 bgcolor=#d6d6d6
| 131455 ||  || — || August 22, 2001 || Socorro || LINEAR || TIR || align=right | 6.9 km || 
|-id=456 bgcolor=#fefefe
| 131456 ||  || — || August 22, 2001 || Palomar || NEAT || H || align=right data-sort-value="0.85" | 850 m || 
|-id=457 bgcolor=#fefefe
| 131457 ||  || — || August 22, 2001 || Palomar || NEAT || H || align=right | 1.2 km || 
|-id=458 bgcolor=#d6d6d6
| 131458 ||  || — || August 22, 2001 || Socorro || LINEAR || — || align=right | 5.8 km || 
|-id=459 bgcolor=#d6d6d6
| 131459 ||  || — || August 22, 2001 || Socorro || LINEAR || — || align=right | 7.6 km || 
|-id=460 bgcolor=#C2FFFF
| 131460 ||  || — || August 22, 2001 || Socorro || LINEAR || L5ENM || align=right | 16 km || 
|-id=461 bgcolor=#d6d6d6
| 131461 ||  || — || August 24, 2001 || Anderson Mesa || LONEOS || — || align=right | 5.5 km || 
|-id=462 bgcolor=#d6d6d6
| 131462 ||  || — || August 24, 2001 || Anderson Mesa || LONEOS || EOS || align=right | 3.2 km || 
|-id=463 bgcolor=#d6d6d6
| 131463 ||  || — || August 17, 2001 || Palomar || NEAT || — || align=right | 5.2 km || 
|-id=464 bgcolor=#d6d6d6
| 131464 ||  || — || August 16, 2001 || Palomar || NEAT || ALA || align=right | 7.2 km || 
|-id=465 bgcolor=#fefefe
| 131465 ||  || — || August 16, 2001 || Palomar || NEAT || H || align=right data-sort-value="0.91" | 910 m || 
|-id=466 bgcolor=#d6d6d6
| 131466 ||  || — || August 23, 2001 || Palomar || NEAT || ALA || align=right | 6.4 km || 
|-id=467 bgcolor=#fefefe
| 131467 ||  || — || September 8, 2001 || Socorro || LINEAR || H || align=right data-sort-value="0.93" | 930 m || 
|-id=468 bgcolor=#d6d6d6
| 131468 ||  || — || September 7, 2001 || Socorro || LINEAR || 3:2 || align=right | 6.9 km || 
|-id=469 bgcolor=#fefefe
| 131469 ||  || — || September 10, 2001 || Socorro || LINEAR || H || align=right | 1.3 km || 
|-id=470 bgcolor=#fefefe
| 131470 ||  || — || September 11, 2001 || Socorro || LINEAR || H || align=right | 1.2 km || 
|-id=471 bgcolor=#fefefe
| 131471 ||  || — || September 11, 2001 || Socorro || LINEAR || H || align=right | 1.3 km || 
|-id=472 bgcolor=#d6d6d6
| 131472 ||  || — || September 10, 2001 || Socorro || LINEAR || TIR || align=right | 5.1 km || 
|-id=473 bgcolor=#E9E9E9
| 131473 ||  || — || September 10, 2001 || Socorro || LINEAR || — || align=right | 2.9 km || 
|-id=474 bgcolor=#d6d6d6
| 131474 ||  || — || September 12, 2001 || Goodricke-Pigott || R. A. Tucker || — || align=right | 6.2 km || 
|-id=475 bgcolor=#d6d6d6
| 131475 ||  || — || September 11, 2001 || Anderson Mesa || LONEOS || EOS || align=right | 5.1 km || 
|-id=476 bgcolor=#d6d6d6
| 131476 ||  || — || September 11, 2001 || Anderson Mesa || LONEOS || — || align=right | 4.4 km || 
|-id=477 bgcolor=#d6d6d6
| 131477 ||  || — || September 11, 2001 || Anderson Mesa || LONEOS || THM || align=right | 5.1 km || 
|-id=478 bgcolor=#fefefe
| 131478 ||  || — || September 11, 2001 || Kitt Peak || Spacewatch || — || align=right | 1.1 km || 
|-id=479 bgcolor=#fefefe
| 131479 ||  || — || September 12, 2001 || Socorro || LINEAR || — || align=right data-sort-value="0.91" | 910 m || 
|-id=480 bgcolor=#d6d6d6
| 131480 ||  || — || September 12, 2001 || Socorro || LINEAR || 7:4 || align=right | 7.1 km || 
|-id=481 bgcolor=#d6d6d6
| 131481 ||  || — || September 12, 2001 || Socorro || LINEAR || 3:2 || align=right | 6.9 km || 
|-id=482 bgcolor=#fefefe
| 131482 ||  || — || September 16, 2001 || Socorro || LINEAR || — || align=right data-sort-value="0.86" | 860 m || 
|-id=483 bgcolor=#d6d6d6
| 131483 ||  || — || September 16, 2001 || Socorro || LINEAR || THM || align=right | 5.2 km || 
|-id=484 bgcolor=#d6d6d6
| 131484 ||  || — || September 16, 2001 || Socorro || LINEAR || MEL || align=right | 6.2 km || 
|-id=485 bgcolor=#d6d6d6
| 131485 ||  || — || September 17, 2001 || Socorro || LINEAR || TIR || align=right | 5.4 km || 
|-id=486 bgcolor=#fefefe
| 131486 ||  || — || September 20, 2001 || Socorro || LINEAR || H || align=right data-sort-value="0.84" | 840 m || 
|-id=487 bgcolor=#fefefe
| 131487 ||  || — || September 20, 2001 || Socorro || LINEAR || — || align=right | 1.3 km || 
|-id=488 bgcolor=#fefefe
| 131488 ||  || — || September 20, 2001 || Socorro || LINEAR || — || align=right | 1.6 km || 
|-id=489 bgcolor=#fefefe
| 131489 ||  || — || September 17, 2001 || Socorro || LINEAR || — || align=right | 1.5 km || 
|-id=490 bgcolor=#d6d6d6
| 131490 ||  || — || September 17, 2001 || Socorro || LINEAR || — || align=right | 7.0 km || 
|-id=491 bgcolor=#fefefe
| 131491 ||  || — || September 17, 2001 || Socorro || LINEAR || — || align=right | 1.3 km || 
|-id=492 bgcolor=#d6d6d6
| 131492 ||  || — || September 19, 2001 || Socorro || LINEAR || — || align=right | 6.8 km || 
|-id=493 bgcolor=#d6d6d6
| 131493 ||  || — || September 19, 2001 || Socorro || LINEAR || — || align=right | 4.0 km || 
|-id=494 bgcolor=#fefefe
| 131494 ||  || — || September 19, 2001 || Socorro || LINEAR || — || align=right data-sort-value="0.89" | 890 m || 
|-id=495 bgcolor=#fefefe
| 131495 ||  || — || September 19, 2001 || Socorro || LINEAR || FLO || align=right data-sort-value="0.82" | 820 m || 
|-id=496 bgcolor=#fefefe
| 131496 ||  || — || September 19, 2001 || Socorro || LINEAR || — || align=right | 1.4 km || 
|-id=497 bgcolor=#fefefe
| 131497 ||  || — || September 19, 2001 || Socorro || LINEAR || — || align=right | 1.1 km || 
|-id=498 bgcolor=#fefefe
| 131498 ||  || — || September 20, 2001 || Socorro || LINEAR || — || align=right | 1.2 km || 
|-id=499 bgcolor=#fefefe
| 131499 ||  || — || September 25, 2001 || Desert Eagle || W. K. Y. Yeung || FLO || align=right | 1.3 km || 
|-id=500 bgcolor=#d6d6d6
| 131500 ||  || — || September 26, 2001 || Fountain Hills || C. W. Juels, P. R. Holvorcem || — || align=right | 9.2 km || 
|}

131501–131600 

|-bgcolor=#d6d6d6
| 131501 ||  || — || September 26, 2001 || Anderson Mesa || LONEOS || ALA || align=right | 7.3 km || 
|-id=502 bgcolor=#d6d6d6
| 131502 ||  || — || September 19, 2001 || Kitt Peak || Spacewatch || SHU3:2 || align=right | 10 km || 
|-id=503 bgcolor=#fefefe
| 131503 ||  || — || September 21, 2001 || Anderson Mesa || LONEOS || — || align=right | 1.4 km || 
|-id=504 bgcolor=#fefefe
| 131504 ||  || — || September 21, 2001 || Anderson Mesa || LONEOS || — || align=right | 1.3 km || 
|-id=505 bgcolor=#fefefe
| 131505 ||  || — || September 27, 2001 || Socorro || LINEAR || — || align=right | 1.5 km || 
|-id=506 bgcolor=#d6d6d6
| 131506 ||  || — || September 28, 2001 || Palomar || NEAT || VER || align=right | 5.4 km || 
|-id=507 bgcolor=#fefefe
| 131507 ||  || — || September 20, 2001 || Socorro || LINEAR || — || align=right data-sort-value="0.68" | 680 m || 
|-id=508 bgcolor=#fefefe
| 131508 ||  || — || September 20, 2001 || Socorro || LINEAR || — || align=right | 1.5 km || 
|-id=509 bgcolor=#E9E9E9
| 131509 ||  || — || October 13, 2001 || Socorro || LINEAR || — || align=right | 1.8 km || 
|-id=510 bgcolor=#fefefe
| 131510 ||  || — || October 14, 2001 || Socorro || LINEAR || — || align=right | 1.3 km || 
|-id=511 bgcolor=#fefefe
| 131511 ||  || — || October 14, 2001 || Socorro || LINEAR || — || align=right | 1.9 km || 
|-id=512 bgcolor=#fefefe
| 131512 ||  || — || October 15, 2001 || Socorro || LINEAR || — || align=right | 1.9 km || 
|-id=513 bgcolor=#fefefe
| 131513 ||  || — || October 13, 2001 || Socorro || LINEAR || — || align=right data-sort-value="0.84" | 840 m || 
|-id=514 bgcolor=#fefefe
| 131514 ||  || — || October 13, 2001 || Socorro || LINEAR || — || align=right | 1.4 km || 
|-id=515 bgcolor=#fefefe
| 131515 ||  || — || October 14, 2001 || Socorro || LINEAR || FLO || align=right | 1.1 km || 
|-id=516 bgcolor=#fefefe
| 131516 ||  || — || October 14, 2001 || Socorro || LINEAR || FLO || align=right | 1.6 km || 
|-id=517 bgcolor=#d6d6d6
| 131517 ||  || — || October 15, 2001 || Socorro || LINEAR || — || align=right | 8.0 km || 
|-id=518 bgcolor=#d6d6d6
| 131518 ||  || — || October 15, 2001 || Socorro || LINEAR || — || align=right | 7.7 km || 
|-id=519 bgcolor=#fefefe
| 131519 ||  || — || October 14, 2001 || Socorro || LINEAR || FLO || align=right | 1.1 km || 
|-id=520 bgcolor=#fefefe
| 131520 ||  || — || October 14, 2001 || Socorro || LINEAR || — || align=right | 1.8 km || 
|-id=521 bgcolor=#fefefe
| 131521 ||  || — || October 14, 2001 || Socorro || LINEAR || FLO || align=right | 1.5 km || 
|-id=522 bgcolor=#d6d6d6
| 131522 ||  || — || October 15, 2001 || Haleakala || NEAT || — || align=right | 7.4 km || 
|-id=523 bgcolor=#d6d6d6
| 131523 ||  || — || October 11, 2001 || Socorro || LINEAR || — || align=right | 7.3 km || 
|-id=524 bgcolor=#fefefe
| 131524 ||  || — || October 15, 2001 || Palomar || NEAT || V || align=right data-sort-value="0.95" | 950 m || 
|-id=525 bgcolor=#fefefe
| 131525 ||  || — || October 17, 2001 || Socorro || LINEAR || — || align=right | 1.1 km || 
|-id=526 bgcolor=#fefefe
| 131526 ||  || — || October 17, 2001 || Socorro || LINEAR || — || align=right data-sort-value="0.95" | 950 m || 
|-id=527 bgcolor=#fefefe
| 131527 ||  || — || October 17, 2001 || Socorro || LINEAR || — || align=right | 1.1 km || 
|-id=528 bgcolor=#fefefe
| 131528 ||  || — || October 17, 2001 || Socorro || LINEAR || — || align=right | 1.3 km || 
|-id=529 bgcolor=#d6d6d6
| 131529 ||  || — || October 17, 2001 || Socorro || LINEAR || — || align=right | 3.8 km || 
|-id=530 bgcolor=#fefefe
| 131530 ||  || — || October 20, 2001 || Socorro || LINEAR || — || align=right | 3.0 km || 
|-id=531 bgcolor=#fefefe
| 131531 ||  || — || October 20, 2001 || Socorro || LINEAR || — || align=right | 2.4 km || 
|-id=532 bgcolor=#fefefe
| 131532 ||  || — || October 19, 2001 || Palomar || NEAT || — || align=right | 1.1 km || 
|-id=533 bgcolor=#fefefe
| 131533 ||  || — || October 20, 2001 || Socorro || LINEAR || — || align=right data-sort-value="0.78" | 780 m || 
|-id=534 bgcolor=#fefefe
| 131534 ||  || — || October 20, 2001 || Socorro || LINEAR || NYS || align=right | 1.00 km || 
|-id=535 bgcolor=#fefefe
| 131535 ||  || — || October 21, 2001 || Socorro || LINEAR || — || align=right | 1.3 km || 
|-id=536 bgcolor=#fefefe
| 131536 ||  || — || October 21, 2001 || Socorro || LINEAR || FLO || align=right | 1.3 km || 
|-id=537 bgcolor=#fefefe
| 131537 ||  || — || October 22, 2001 || Socorro || LINEAR || — || align=right data-sort-value="0.88" | 880 m || 
|-id=538 bgcolor=#fefefe
| 131538 ||  || — || October 22, 2001 || Socorro || LINEAR || — || align=right | 1.8 km || 
|-id=539 bgcolor=#C2FFFF
| 131539 ||  || — || October 21, 2001 || Socorro || LINEAR || L5 || align=right | 13 km || 
|-id=540 bgcolor=#fefefe
| 131540 ||  || — || October 23, 2001 || Socorro || LINEAR || — || align=right data-sort-value="0.99" | 990 m || 
|-id=541 bgcolor=#fefefe
| 131541 ||  || — || October 23, 2001 || Socorro || LINEAR || — || align=right | 1.0 km || 
|-id=542 bgcolor=#fefefe
| 131542 ||  || — || October 23, 2001 || Socorro || LINEAR || FLO || align=right | 1.1 km || 
|-id=543 bgcolor=#fefefe
| 131543 ||  || — || October 17, 2001 || Haleakala || NEAT || FLO || align=right data-sort-value="0.86" | 860 m || 
|-id=544 bgcolor=#d6d6d6
| 131544 ||  || — || October 21, 2001 || Socorro || LINEAR || — || align=right | 5.1 km || 
|-id=545 bgcolor=#fefefe
| 131545 ||  || — || October 20, 2001 || Palomar || NEAT || — || align=right | 1.2 km || 
|-id=546 bgcolor=#C2FFFF
| 131546 ||  || — || November 9, 2001 || Kitt Peak || Spacewatch || L5 || align=right | 11 km || 
|-id=547 bgcolor=#fefefe
| 131547 ||  || — || November 10, 2001 || Socorro || LINEAR || — || align=right | 1.5 km || 
|-id=548 bgcolor=#fefefe
| 131548 ||  || — || November 11, 2001 || Ondřejov || P. Pravec, P. Kušnirák || NYS || align=right | 1.0 km || 
|-id=549 bgcolor=#fefefe
| 131549 ||  || — || November 9, 2001 || Socorro || LINEAR || — || align=right | 1.2 km || 
|-id=550 bgcolor=#fefefe
| 131550 ||  || — || November 9, 2001 || Socorro || LINEAR || FLO || align=right | 1.2 km || 
|-id=551 bgcolor=#fefefe
| 131551 ||  || — || November 9, 2001 || Socorro || LINEAR || FLO || align=right | 1.2 km || 
|-id=552 bgcolor=#fefefe
| 131552 ||  || — || November 9, 2001 || Socorro || LINEAR || — || align=right | 1.3 km || 
|-id=553 bgcolor=#fefefe
| 131553 ||  || — || November 9, 2001 || Socorro || LINEAR || — || align=right | 1.3 km || 
|-id=554 bgcolor=#fefefe
| 131554 ||  || — || November 9, 2001 || Socorro || LINEAR || — || align=right | 1.4 km || 
|-id=555 bgcolor=#fefefe
| 131555 ||  || — || November 9, 2001 || Socorro || LINEAR || — || align=right | 1.3 km || 
|-id=556 bgcolor=#fefefe
| 131556 ||  || — || November 9, 2001 || Socorro || LINEAR || — || align=right | 1.2 km || 
|-id=557 bgcolor=#fefefe
| 131557 ||  || — || November 9, 2001 || Socorro || LINEAR || — || align=right | 1.3 km || 
|-id=558 bgcolor=#fefefe
| 131558 ||  || — || November 9, 2001 || Socorro || LINEAR || FLO || align=right | 1.3 km || 
|-id=559 bgcolor=#fefefe
| 131559 ||  || — || November 9, 2001 || Socorro || LINEAR || — || align=right | 1.9 km || 
|-id=560 bgcolor=#fefefe
| 131560 ||  || — || November 9, 2001 || Socorro || LINEAR || FLO || align=right | 1.1 km || 
|-id=561 bgcolor=#fefefe
| 131561 ||  || — || November 9, 2001 || Socorro || LINEAR || — || align=right | 1.5 km || 
|-id=562 bgcolor=#fefefe
| 131562 ||  || — || November 9, 2001 || Socorro || LINEAR || — || align=right | 1.4 km || 
|-id=563 bgcolor=#fefefe
| 131563 ||  || — || November 9, 2001 || Socorro || LINEAR || FLO || align=right | 1.5 km || 
|-id=564 bgcolor=#fefefe
| 131564 ||  || — || November 9, 2001 || Socorro || LINEAR || FLO || align=right | 1.4 km || 
|-id=565 bgcolor=#fefefe
| 131565 ||  || — || November 9, 2001 || Socorro || LINEAR || — || align=right | 1.8 km || 
|-id=566 bgcolor=#fefefe
| 131566 ||  || — || November 10, 2001 || Socorro || LINEAR || — || align=right | 1.4 km || 
|-id=567 bgcolor=#fefefe
| 131567 ||  || — || November 10, 2001 || Socorro || LINEAR || — || align=right | 1.1 km || 
|-id=568 bgcolor=#fefefe
| 131568 ||  || — || November 10, 2001 || Socorro || LINEAR || — || align=right | 1.5 km || 
|-id=569 bgcolor=#fefefe
| 131569 ||  || — || November 10, 2001 || Socorro || LINEAR || FLO || align=right data-sort-value="0.86" | 860 m || 
|-id=570 bgcolor=#fefefe
| 131570 ||  || — || November 10, 2001 || Socorro || LINEAR || — || align=right | 1.4 km || 
|-id=571 bgcolor=#fefefe
| 131571 ||  || — || November 10, 2001 || Socorro || LINEAR || — || align=right | 1.8 km || 
|-id=572 bgcolor=#fefefe
| 131572 ||  || — || November 10, 2001 || Socorro || LINEAR || ERI || align=right | 3.3 km || 
|-id=573 bgcolor=#fefefe
| 131573 ||  || — || November 9, 2001 || Palomar || NEAT || FLO || align=right | 1.1 km || 
|-id=574 bgcolor=#fefefe
| 131574 ||  || — || November 12, 2001 || Socorro || LINEAR || — || align=right | 1.3 km || 
|-id=575 bgcolor=#d6d6d6
| 131575 ||  || — || November 13, 2001 || Socorro || LINEAR || ALA || align=right | 12 km || 
|-id=576 bgcolor=#d6d6d6
| 131576 ||  || — || November 13, 2001 || Socorro || LINEAR || — || align=right | 7.7 km || 
|-id=577 bgcolor=#fefefe
| 131577 ||  || — || November 12, 2001 || Socorro || LINEAR || — || align=right | 1.7 km || 
|-id=578 bgcolor=#fefefe
| 131578 ||  || — || November 12, 2001 || Socorro || LINEAR || — || align=right | 1.3 km || 
|-id=579 bgcolor=#fefefe
| 131579 ||  || — || November 12, 2001 || Socorro || LINEAR || — || align=right | 1.2 km || 
|-id=580 bgcolor=#fefefe
| 131580 ||  || — || November 12, 2001 || Socorro || LINEAR || FLO || align=right | 1.5 km || 
|-id=581 bgcolor=#C2FFFF
| 131581 ||  || — || November 15, 2001 || Kitt Peak || Spacewatch || L5 || align=right | 13 km || 
|-id=582 bgcolor=#fefefe
| 131582 ||  || — || November 20, 2001 || Socorro || LINEAR || — || align=right | 1.4 km || 
|-id=583 bgcolor=#fefefe
| 131583 ||  || — || November 20, 2001 || Socorro || LINEAR || H || align=right | 1.3 km || 
|-id=584 bgcolor=#fefefe
| 131584 ||  || — || November 22, 2001 || Oizumi || T. Kobayashi || — || align=right | 2.9 km || 
|-id=585 bgcolor=#fefefe
| 131585 ||  || — || November 17, 2001 || Socorro || LINEAR || FLO || align=right | 1.0 km || 
|-id=586 bgcolor=#fefefe
| 131586 ||  || — || November 17, 2001 || Socorro || LINEAR || — || align=right | 1.1 km || 
|-id=587 bgcolor=#fefefe
| 131587 ||  || — || November 17, 2001 || Socorro || LINEAR || FLO || align=right | 1.00 km || 
|-id=588 bgcolor=#fefefe
| 131588 ||  || — || November 17, 2001 || Socorro || LINEAR || FLO || align=right | 1.0 km || 
|-id=589 bgcolor=#fefefe
| 131589 ||  || — || November 17, 2001 || Socorro || LINEAR || — || align=right | 1.1 km || 
|-id=590 bgcolor=#fefefe
| 131590 ||  || — || November 17, 2001 || Socorro || LINEAR || — || align=right | 1.4 km || 
|-id=591 bgcolor=#fefefe
| 131591 ||  || — || November 19, 2001 || Socorro || LINEAR || — || align=right data-sort-value="0.97" | 970 m || 
|-id=592 bgcolor=#fefefe
| 131592 ||  || — || November 20, 2001 || Socorro || LINEAR || H || align=right | 1.2 km || 
|-id=593 bgcolor=#fefefe
| 131593 ||  || — || November 17, 2001 || Socorro || LINEAR || — || align=right | 1.5 km || 
|-id=594 bgcolor=#fefefe
| 131594 ||  || — || November 17, 2001 || Socorro || LINEAR || FLO || align=right | 1.4 km || 
|-id=595 bgcolor=#fefefe
| 131595 ||  || — || November 16, 2001 || Kitt Peak || Spacewatch || — || align=right data-sort-value="0.93" | 930 m || 
|-id=596 bgcolor=#FA8072
| 131596 || 2001 XK || — || December 4, 2001 || Socorro || LINEAR || PHO || align=right | 3.1 km || 
|-id=597 bgcolor=#fefefe
| 131597 ||  || — || December 8, 2001 || Socorro || LINEAR || PHO || align=right | 4.7 km || 
|-id=598 bgcolor=#fefefe
| 131598 ||  || — || December 12, 2001 || Palomar || NEAT || H || align=right | 1.3 km || 
|-id=599 bgcolor=#fefefe
| 131599 ||  || — || December 7, 2001 || Socorro || LINEAR || FLO || align=right | 1.2 km || 
|-id=600 bgcolor=#fefefe
| 131600 ||  || — || December 9, 2001 || Socorro || LINEAR || — || align=right | 1.0 km || 
|}

131601–131700 

|-bgcolor=#E9E9E9
| 131601 ||  || — || December 9, 2001 || Socorro || LINEAR || — || align=right | 3.2 km || 
|-id=602 bgcolor=#fefefe
| 131602 ||  || — || December 9, 2001 || Socorro || LINEAR || — || align=right | 2.8 km || 
|-id=603 bgcolor=#fefefe
| 131603 ||  || — || December 9, 2001 || Socorro || LINEAR || ERI || align=right | 3.3 km || 
|-id=604 bgcolor=#fefefe
| 131604 ||  || — || December 9, 2001 || Socorro || LINEAR || FLO || align=right | 1.8 km || 
|-id=605 bgcolor=#fefefe
| 131605 ||  || — || December 9, 2001 || Socorro || LINEAR || — || align=right | 1.5 km || 
|-id=606 bgcolor=#fefefe
| 131606 ||  || — || December 9, 2001 || Socorro || LINEAR || FLO || align=right | 1.3 km || 
|-id=607 bgcolor=#fefefe
| 131607 ||  || — || December 9, 2001 || Socorro || LINEAR || — || align=right | 1.8 km || 
|-id=608 bgcolor=#fefefe
| 131608 ||  || — || December 9, 2001 || Socorro || LINEAR || — || align=right | 1.8 km || 
|-id=609 bgcolor=#fefefe
| 131609 ||  || — || December 9, 2001 || Socorro || LINEAR || V || align=right | 1.5 km || 
|-id=610 bgcolor=#fefefe
| 131610 ||  || — || December 9, 2001 || Socorro || LINEAR || — || align=right | 1.4 km || 
|-id=611 bgcolor=#fefefe
| 131611 ||  || — || December 9, 2001 || Socorro || LINEAR || FLO || align=right | 1.6 km || 
|-id=612 bgcolor=#fefefe
| 131612 ||  || — || December 10, 2001 || Socorro || LINEAR || — || align=right | 1.8 km || 
|-id=613 bgcolor=#fefefe
| 131613 ||  || — || December 10, 2001 || Socorro || LINEAR || — || align=right | 1.9 km || 
|-id=614 bgcolor=#fefefe
| 131614 ||  || — || December 10, 2001 || Socorro || LINEAR || — || align=right | 1.6 km || 
|-id=615 bgcolor=#fefefe
| 131615 ||  || — || December 10, 2001 || Socorro || LINEAR || — || align=right | 2.2 km || 
|-id=616 bgcolor=#fefefe
| 131616 ||  || — || December 11, 2001 || Socorro || LINEAR || — || align=right | 1.6 km || 
|-id=617 bgcolor=#fefefe
| 131617 ||  || — || December 10, 2001 || Socorro || LINEAR || FLO || align=right | 1.1 km || 
|-id=618 bgcolor=#fefefe
| 131618 ||  || — || December 7, 2001 || Socorro || LINEAR || MAS || align=right | 1.3 km || 
|-id=619 bgcolor=#fefefe
| 131619 ||  || — || December 9, 2001 || Socorro || LINEAR || V || align=right | 1.3 km || 
|-id=620 bgcolor=#fefefe
| 131620 ||  || — || December 9, 2001 || Socorro || LINEAR || — || align=right | 1.4 km || 
|-id=621 bgcolor=#fefefe
| 131621 ||  || — || December 9, 2001 || Socorro || LINEAR || — || align=right | 1.7 km || 
|-id=622 bgcolor=#fefefe
| 131622 ||  || — || December 9, 2001 || Socorro || LINEAR || — || align=right | 1.3 km || 
|-id=623 bgcolor=#fefefe
| 131623 ||  || — || December 9, 2001 || Socorro || LINEAR || FLO || align=right | 1.4 km || 
|-id=624 bgcolor=#fefefe
| 131624 ||  || — || December 10, 2001 || Socorro || LINEAR || — || align=right | 1.7 km || 
|-id=625 bgcolor=#fefefe
| 131625 ||  || — || December 10, 2001 || Socorro || LINEAR || V || align=right | 1.1 km || 
|-id=626 bgcolor=#fefefe
| 131626 ||  || — || December 10, 2001 || Socorro || LINEAR || — || align=right | 1.8 km || 
|-id=627 bgcolor=#fefefe
| 131627 ||  || — || December 10, 2001 || Socorro || LINEAR || — || align=right | 1.7 km || 
|-id=628 bgcolor=#fefefe
| 131628 ||  || — || December 10, 2001 || Socorro || LINEAR || — || align=right | 1.6 km || 
|-id=629 bgcolor=#fefefe
| 131629 ||  || — || December 10, 2001 || Socorro || LINEAR || — || align=right | 2.0 km || 
|-id=630 bgcolor=#fefefe
| 131630 ||  || — || December 10, 2001 || Socorro || LINEAR || — || align=right | 1.9 km || 
|-id=631 bgcolor=#fefefe
| 131631 ||  || — || December 10, 2001 || Socorro || LINEAR || — || align=right | 1.7 km || 
|-id=632 bgcolor=#fefefe
| 131632 ||  || — || December 10, 2001 || Socorro || LINEAR || FLO || align=right | 1.5 km || 
|-id=633 bgcolor=#fefefe
| 131633 ||  || — || December 10, 2001 || Socorro || LINEAR || EUT || align=right | 1.2 km || 
|-id=634 bgcolor=#FA8072
| 131634 ||  || — || December 10, 2001 || Socorro || LINEAR || — || align=right | 2.7 km || 
|-id=635 bgcolor=#C2FFFF
| 131635 ||  || — || December 11, 2001 || Socorro || LINEAR || L5 || align=right | 15 km || 
|-id=636 bgcolor=#fefefe
| 131636 ||  || — || December 11, 2001 || Socorro || LINEAR || MAS || align=right | 1.1 km || 
|-id=637 bgcolor=#fefefe
| 131637 ||  || — || December 11, 2001 || Socorro || LINEAR || — || align=right | 1.5 km || 
|-id=638 bgcolor=#fefefe
| 131638 ||  || — || December 11, 2001 || Socorro || LINEAR || — || align=right | 1.9 km || 
|-id=639 bgcolor=#fefefe
| 131639 ||  || — || December 11, 2001 || Socorro || LINEAR || — || align=right | 1.0 km || 
|-id=640 bgcolor=#fefefe
| 131640 ||  || — || December 11, 2001 || Socorro || LINEAR || — || align=right | 1.7 km || 
|-id=641 bgcolor=#fefefe
| 131641 ||  || — || December 11, 2001 || Socorro || LINEAR || — || align=right | 1.3 km || 
|-id=642 bgcolor=#fefefe
| 131642 ||  || — || December 11, 2001 || Socorro || LINEAR || — || align=right | 2.2 km || 
|-id=643 bgcolor=#fefefe
| 131643 ||  || — || December 11, 2001 || Socorro || LINEAR || NYS || align=right | 1.1 km || 
|-id=644 bgcolor=#fefefe
| 131644 ||  || — || December 11, 2001 || Socorro || LINEAR || — || align=right | 1.7 km || 
|-id=645 bgcolor=#fefefe
| 131645 ||  || — || December 13, 2001 || Socorro || LINEAR || FLO || align=right | 1.0 km || 
|-id=646 bgcolor=#fefefe
| 131646 ||  || — || December 14, 2001 || Desert Eagle || W. K. Y. Yeung || FLO || align=right | 1.7 km || 
|-id=647 bgcolor=#d6d6d6
| 131647 ||  || — || December 10, 2001 || Socorro || LINEAR || — || align=right | 4.9 km || 
|-id=648 bgcolor=#fefefe
| 131648 ||  || — || December 10, 2001 || Socorro || LINEAR || — || align=right | 2.4 km || 
|-id=649 bgcolor=#fefefe
| 131649 ||  || — || December 10, 2001 || Socorro || LINEAR || FLO || align=right | 1.2 km || 
|-id=650 bgcolor=#fefefe
| 131650 ||  || — || December 14, 2001 || Socorro || LINEAR || — || align=right | 1.4 km || 
|-id=651 bgcolor=#fefefe
| 131651 ||  || — || December 14, 2001 || Kitt Peak || Spacewatch || — || align=right | 1.4 km || 
|-id=652 bgcolor=#fefefe
| 131652 ||  || — || December 9, 2001 || Socorro || LINEAR || — || align=right | 1.4 km || 
|-id=653 bgcolor=#fefefe
| 131653 ||  || — || December 10, 2001 || Socorro || LINEAR || — || align=right | 1.5 km || 
|-id=654 bgcolor=#fefefe
| 131654 ||  || — || December 10, 2001 || Socorro || LINEAR || FLO || align=right | 1.1 km || 
|-id=655 bgcolor=#fefefe
| 131655 ||  || — || December 11, 2001 || Socorro || LINEAR || FLO || align=right | 2.4 km || 
|-id=656 bgcolor=#fefefe
| 131656 ||  || — || December 13, 2001 || Socorro || LINEAR || — || align=right | 1.8 km || 
|-id=657 bgcolor=#fefefe
| 131657 ||  || — || December 13, 2001 || Socorro || LINEAR || — || align=right | 2.9 km || 
|-id=658 bgcolor=#fefefe
| 131658 ||  || — || December 13, 2001 || Socorro || LINEAR || FLO || align=right | 1.1 km || 
|-id=659 bgcolor=#fefefe
| 131659 ||  || — || December 14, 2001 || Socorro || LINEAR || — || align=right | 1.3 km || 
|-id=660 bgcolor=#E9E9E9
| 131660 ||  || — || December 14, 2001 || Socorro || LINEAR || — || align=right | 1.7 km || 
|-id=661 bgcolor=#fefefe
| 131661 ||  || — || December 14, 2001 || Socorro || LINEAR || — || align=right | 1.3 km || 
|-id=662 bgcolor=#fefefe
| 131662 ||  || — || December 14, 2001 || Socorro || LINEAR || — || align=right | 1.3 km || 
|-id=663 bgcolor=#fefefe
| 131663 ||  || — || December 14, 2001 || Socorro || LINEAR || — || align=right | 1.4 km || 
|-id=664 bgcolor=#fefefe
| 131664 ||  || — || December 14, 2001 || Socorro || LINEAR || — || align=right | 1.6 km || 
|-id=665 bgcolor=#fefefe
| 131665 ||  || — || December 14, 2001 || Socorro || LINEAR || — || align=right | 1.5 km || 
|-id=666 bgcolor=#fefefe
| 131666 ||  || — || December 14, 2001 || Socorro || LINEAR || V || align=right | 1.5 km || 
|-id=667 bgcolor=#E9E9E9
| 131667 ||  || — || December 14, 2001 || Socorro || LINEAR || — || align=right | 2.0 km || 
|-id=668 bgcolor=#fefefe
| 131668 ||  || — || December 14, 2001 || Socorro || LINEAR || — || align=right | 1.3 km || 
|-id=669 bgcolor=#fefefe
| 131669 ||  || — || December 14, 2001 || Socorro || LINEAR || — || align=right | 1.8 km || 
|-id=670 bgcolor=#fefefe
| 131670 ||  || — || December 14, 2001 || Socorro || LINEAR || — || align=right | 1.5 km || 
|-id=671 bgcolor=#fefefe
| 131671 ||  || — || December 14, 2001 || Socorro || LINEAR || — || align=right | 1.9 km || 
|-id=672 bgcolor=#fefefe
| 131672 ||  || — || December 14, 2001 || Socorro || LINEAR || V || align=right | 1.1 km || 
|-id=673 bgcolor=#fefefe
| 131673 ||  || — || December 14, 2001 || Socorro || LINEAR || — || align=right | 1.4 km || 
|-id=674 bgcolor=#fefefe
| 131674 ||  || — || December 14, 2001 || Socorro || LINEAR || — || align=right | 1.2 km || 
|-id=675 bgcolor=#fefefe
| 131675 ||  || — || December 14, 2001 || Socorro || LINEAR || FLO || align=right | 2.2 km || 
|-id=676 bgcolor=#fefefe
| 131676 ||  || — || December 14, 2001 || Socorro || LINEAR || V || align=right | 1.5 km || 
|-id=677 bgcolor=#fefefe
| 131677 ||  || — || December 14, 2001 || Socorro || LINEAR || EUT || align=right | 1.4 km || 
|-id=678 bgcolor=#fefefe
| 131678 ||  || — || December 14, 2001 || Socorro || LINEAR || — || align=right | 1.4 km || 
|-id=679 bgcolor=#fefefe
| 131679 ||  || — || December 14, 2001 || Socorro || LINEAR || FLO || align=right | 1.9 km || 
|-id=680 bgcolor=#fefefe
| 131680 ||  || — || December 14, 2001 || Socorro || LINEAR || — || align=right | 1.5 km || 
|-id=681 bgcolor=#fefefe
| 131681 ||  || — || December 14, 2001 || Socorro || LINEAR || — || align=right data-sort-value="0.94" | 940 m || 
|-id=682 bgcolor=#fefefe
| 131682 ||  || — || December 14, 2001 || Socorro || LINEAR || FLO || align=right | 2.2 km || 
|-id=683 bgcolor=#fefefe
| 131683 ||  || — || December 14, 2001 || Socorro || LINEAR || — || align=right | 1.6 km || 
|-id=684 bgcolor=#fefefe
| 131684 ||  || — || December 14, 2001 || Socorro || LINEAR || — || align=right | 1.7 km || 
|-id=685 bgcolor=#fefefe
| 131685 ||  || — || December 10, 2001 || Bergisch Gladbach || W. Bickel || — || align=right | 3.5 km || 
|-id=686 bgcolor=#fefefe
| 131686 ||  || — || December 11, 2001 || Socorro || LINEAR || — || align=right | 3.7 km || 
|-id=687 bgcolor=#fefefe
| 131687 ||  || — || December 11, 2001 || Socorro || LINEAR || — || align=right | 1.4 km || 
|-id=688 bgcolor=#fefefe
| 131688 ||  || — || December 11, 2001 || Socorro || LINEAR || FLO || align=right | 1.1 km || 
|-id=689 bgcolor=#fefefe
| 131689 ||  || — || December 11, 2001 || Socorro || LINEAR || — || align=right | 1.4 km || 
|-id=690 bgcolor=#fefefe
| 131690 ||  || — || December 11, 2001 || Socorro || LINEAR || — || align=right | 2.0 km || 
|-id=691 bgcolor=#fefefe
| 131691 ||  || — || December 15, 2001 || Socorro || LINEAR || NYS || align=right | 1.0 km || 
|-id=692 bgcolor=#fefefe
| 131692 ||  || — || December 15, 2001 || Socorro || LINEAR || NYS || align=right | 1.2 km || 
|-id=693 bgcolor=#fefefe
| 131693 ||  || — || December 15, 2001 || Socorro || LINEAR || — || align=right | 1.4 km || 
|-id=694 bgcolor=#fefefe
| 131694 ||  || — || December 15, 2001 || Socorro || LINEAR || — || align=right | 1.6 km || 
|-id=695 bgcolor=#C2E0FF
| 131695 ||  || — || December 9, 2001 || Mauna Kea || S. S. Sheppard, J. Kleyna, D. C. Jewitt || other TNO || align=right | 128 km || 
|-id=696 bgcolor=#C2E0FF
| 131696 ||  || — || December 9, 2001 || Mauna Kea || S. S. Sheppard, J. Kleyna, D. C. Jewitt || res3:7 || align=right | 147 km || 
|-id=697 bgcolor=#C2E0FF
| 131697 ||  || — || December 11, 2001 || Mauna Kea || J. Kleyna, S. S. Sheppard, D. C. Jewitt || res4:5critical || align=right | 97 km || 
|-id=698 bgcolor=#fefefe
| 131698 ||  || — || December 7, 2001 || Palomar || NEAT || — || align=right | 1.1 km || 
|-id=699 bgcolor=#fefefe
| 131699 || 2001 YA || — || December 16, 2001 || Oaxaca || J. M. Roe || NYS || align=right | 1.0 km || 
|-id=700 bgcolor=#fefefe
| 131700 || 2001 YN || — || December 17, 2001 || Fountain Hills || C. W. Juels, P. R. Holvorcem || PHO || align=right | 2.1 km || 
|}

131701–131800 

|-bgcolor=#fefefe
| 131701 || 2001 YV || — || December 18, 2001 || Kingsnake || J. V. McClusky || — || align=right | 3.5 km || 
|-id=702 bgcolor=#FA8072
| 131702 ||  || — || December 22, 2001 || Socorro || LINEAR || — || align=right | 3.3 km || 
|-id=703 bgcolor=#fefefe
| 131703 ||  || — || December 17, 2001 || Socorro || LINEAR || — || align=right | 1.4 km || 
|-id=704 bgcolor=#fefefe
| 131704 ||  || — || December 17, 2001 || Socorro || LINEAR || NYS || align=right | 1.2 km || 
|-id=705 bgcolor=#fefefe
| 131705 ||  || — || December 17, 2001 || Socorro || LINEAR || FLO || align=right | 1.3 km || 
|-id=706 bgcolor=#E9E9E9
| 131706 ||  || — || December 17, 2001 || Socorro || LINEAR || — || align=right | 2.5 km || 
|-id=707 bgcolor=#fefefe
| 131707 ||  || — || December 18, 2001 || Socorro || LINEAR || — || align=right | 1.3 km || 
|-id=708 bgcolor=#fefefe
| 131708 ||  || — || December 18, 2001 || Socorro || LINEAR || — || align=right | 1.1 km || 
|-id=709 bgcolor=#fefefe
| 131709 ||  || — || December 18, 2001 || Socorro || LINEAR || — || align=right | 3.3 km || 
|-id=710 bgcolor=#E9E9E9
| 131710 ||  || — || December 18, 2001 || Socorro || LINEAR || — || align=right | 1.6 km || 
|-id=711 bgcolor=#fefefe
| 131711 ||  || — || December 18, 2001 || Socorro || LINEAR || — || align=right | 3.3 km || 
|-id=712 bgcolor=#fefefe
| 131712 ||  || — || December 18, 2001 || Socorro || LINEAR || MAS || align=right | 1.2 km || 
|-id=713 bgcolor=#fefefe
| 131713 ||  || — || December 18, 2001 || Socorro || LINEAR || — || align=right | 1.3 km || 
|-id=714 bgcolor=#E9E9E9
| 131714 ||  || — || December 18, 2001 || Socorro || LINEAR || — || align=right | 2.8 km || 
|-id=715 bgcolor=#fefefe
| 131715 ||  || — || December 18, 2001 || Socorro || LINEAR || — || align=right | 1.4 km || 
|-id=716 bgcolor=#fefefe
| 131716 ||  || — || December 18, 2001 || Socorro || LINEAR || — || align=right | 1.4 km || 
|-id=717 bgcolor=#fefefe
| 131717 ||  || — || December 18, 2001 || Socorro || LINEAR || FLO || align=right | 2.3 km || 
|-id=718 bgcolor=#fefefe
| 131718 ||  || — || December 18, 2001 || Socorro || LINEAR || FLO || align=right | 1.3 km || 
|-id=719 bgcolor=#E9E9E9
| 131719 ||  || — || December 18, 2001 || Socorro || LINEAR || — || align=right | 2.4 km || 
|-id=720 bgcolor=#fefefe
| 131720 ||  || — || December 18, 2001 || Socorro || LINEAR || NYS || align=right | 1.3 km || 
|-id=721 bgcolor=#fefefe
| 131721 ||  || — || December 18, 2001 || Socorro || LINEAR || — || align=right | 1.7 km || 
|-id=722 bgcolor=#fefefe
| 131722 ||  || — || December 18, 2001 || Socorro || LINEAR || NYS || align=right | 1.4 km || 
|-id=723 bgcolor=#fefefe
| 131723 ||  || — || December 18, 2001 || Socorro || LINEAR || — || align=right | 1.6 km || 
|-id=724 bgcolor=#fefefe
| 131724 ||  || — || December 18, 2001 || Socorro || LINEAR || — || align=right | 1.6 km || 
|-id=725 bgcolor=#fefefe
| 131725 ||  || — || December 18, 2001 || Socorro || LINEAR || — || align=right | 2.3 km || 
|-id=726 bgcolor=#fefefe
| 131726 ||  || — || December 18, 2001 || Socorro || LINEAR || NYS || align=right | 2.6 km || 
|-id=727 bgcolor=#E9E9E9
| 131727 ||  || — || December 18, 2001 || Socorro || LINEAR || — || align=right | 2.3 km || 
|-id=728 bgcolor=#fefefe
| 131728 ||  || — || December 18, 2001 || Socorro || LINEAR || NYS || align=right | 3.7 km || 
|-id=729 bgcolor=#fefefe
| 131729 ||  || — || December 17, 2001 || Palomar || NEAT || FLO || align=right | 1.4 km || 
|-id=730 bgcolor=#fefefe
| 131730 ||  || — || December 18, 2001 || Palomar || NEAT || FLO || align=right | 1.8 km || 
|-id=731 bgcolor=#fefefe
| 131731 ||  || — || December 17, 2001 || Palomar || NEAT || MAS || align=right | 1.2 km || 
|-id=732 bgcolor=#fefefe
| 131732 ||  || — || December 17, 2001 || Socorro || LINEAR || — || align=right | 2.2 km || 
|-id=733 bgcolor=#fefefe
| 131733 ||  || — || December 18, 2001 || Socorro || LINEAR || — || align=right | 1.1 km || 
|-id=734 bgcolor=#fefefe
| 131734 ||  || — || December 18, 2001 || Anderson Mesa || LONEOS || V || align=right | 1.4 km || 
|-id=735 bgcolor=#fefefe
| 131735 ||  || — || December 19, 2001 || Socorro || LINEAR || — || align=right | 1.5 km || 
|-id=736 bgcolor=#fefefe
| 131736 ||  || — || December 19, 2001 || Socorro || LINEAR || — || align=right | 1.7 km || 
|-id=737 bgcolor=#E9E9E9
| 131737 ||  || — || December 19, 2001 || Socorro || LINEAR || — || align=right | 1.9 km || 
|-id=738 bgcolor=#fefefe
| 131738 ||  || — || December 19, 2001 || Goodricke-Pigott || R. A. Tucker || — || align=right | 2.6 km || 
|-id=739 bgcolor=#fefefe
| 131739 ||  || — || December 17, 2001 || Socorro || LINEAR || — || align=right | 1.6 km || 
|-id=740 bgcolor=#fefefe
| 131740 ||  || — || December 18, 2001 || Socorro || LINEAR || — || align=right | 1.6 km || 
|-id=741 bgcolor=#fefefe
| 131741 ||  || — || December 17, 2001 || Socorro || LINEAR || FLO || align=right data-sort-value="0.94" | 940 m || 
|-id=742 bgcolor=#fefefe
| 131742 ||  || — || December 17, 2001 || Socorro || LINEAR || — || align=right | 1.4 km || 
|-id=743 bgcolor=#fefefe
| 131743 ||  || — || December 17, 2001 || Socorro || LINEAR || — || align=right | 1.4 km || 
|-id=744 bgcolor=#fefefe
| 131744 ||  || — || December 17, 2001 || Socorro || LINEAR || — || align=right | 1.5 km || 
|-id=745 bgcolor=#fefefe
| 131745 ||  || — || December 17, 2001 || Socorro || LINEAR || FLO || align=right data-sort-value="0.99" | 990 m || 
|-id=746 bgcolor=#fefefe
| 131746 ||  || — || December 17, 2001 || Socorro || LINEAR || V || align=right | 1.2 km || 
|-id=747 bgcolor=#fefefe
| 131747 ||  || — || December 21, 2001 || Haleakala || NEAT || FLO || align=right | 2.1 km || 
|-id=748 bgcolor=#fefefe
| 131748 ||  || — || December 20, 2001 || Kitt Peak || Spacewatch || NYS || align=right data-sort-value="0.96" | 960 m || 
|-id=749 bgcolor=#fefefe
| 131749 ||  || — || December 17, 2001 || Socorro || LINEAR || FLO || align=right | 1.4 km || 
|-id=750 bgcolor=#fefefe
| 131750 ||  || — || December 22, 2001 || Socorro || LINEAR || — || align=right | 1.9 km || 
|-id=751 bgcolor=#fefefe
| 131751 ||  || — || December 19, 2001 || Palomar || NEAT || FLO || align=right | 1.4 km || 
|-id=752 bgcolor=#fefefe
| 131752 ||  || — || December 19, 2001 || Palomar || NEAT || — || align=right | 1.6 km || 
|-id=753 bgcolor=#fefefe
| 131753 ||  || — || December 19, 2001 || Palomar || NEAT || — || align=right | 1.9 km || 
|-id=754 bgcolor=#fefefe
| 131754 || 2002 AO || — || January 5, 2002 || Oizumi || T. Kobayashi || — || align=right | 2.0 km || 
|-id=755 bgcolor=#fefefe
| 131755 ||  || — || January 6, 2002 || Oizumi || T. Kobayashi || — || align=right | 4.4 km || 
|-id=756 bgcolor=#fefefe
| 131756 ||  || — || January 6, 2002 || Oizumi || T. Kobayashi || — || align=right | 3.8 km || 
|-id=757 bgcolor=#fefefe
| 131757 ||  || — || January 6, 2002 || Socorro || LINEAR || PHO || align=right | 2.0 km || 
|-id=758 bgcolor=#fefefe
| 131758 ||  || — || January 4, 2002 || Haleakala || NEAT || — || align=right | 3.9 km || 
|-id=759 bgcolor=#fefefe
| 131759 ||  || — || January 6, 2002 || Kitt Peak || Spacewatch || EUT || align=right data-sort-value="0.90" | 900 m || 
|-id=760 bgcolor=#fefefe
| 131760 ||  || — || January 11, 2002 || Desert Eagle || W. K. Y. Yeung || — || align=right | 4.0 km || 
|-id=761 bgcolor=#fefefe
| 131761 ||  || — || January 11, 2002 || Desert Eagle || W. K. Y. Yeung || NYS || align=right | 1.6 km || 
|-id=762 bgcolor=#E9E9E9
| 131762 Csonka ||  ||  || January 11, 2002 || Piszkéstető || K. Sárneczky, Z. Heiner || — || align=right | 1.3 km || 
|-id=763 bgcolor=#fefefe
| 131763 Donátbánki ||  ||  || January 11, 2002 || Piszkéstető || K. Sárneczky, Z. Heiner || MAS || align=right | 1.1 km || 
|-id=764 bgcolor=#fefefe
| 131764 ||  || — || January 10, 2002 || Campo Imperatore || CINEOS || — || align=right | 1.2 km || 
|-id=765 bgcolor=#fefefe
| 131765 ||  || — || January 10, 2002 || Campo Imperatore || CINEOS || V || align=right | 1.5 km || 
|-id=766 bgcolor=#fefefe
| 131766 ||  || — || January 10, 2002 || Campo Imperatore || CINEOS || — || align=right | 1.6 km || 
|-id=767 bgcolor=#fefefe
| 131767 ||  || — || January 11, 2002 || Campo Imperatore || CINEOS || — || align=right | 1.5 km || 
|-id=768 bgcolor=#fefefe
| 131768 ||  || — || January 12, 2002 || Desert Eagle || W. K. Y. Yeung || — || align=right | 2.8 km || 
|-id=769 bgcolor=#fefefe
| 131769 ||  || — || January 6, 2002 || Socorro || LINEAR || — || align=right | 4.3 km || 
|-id=770 bgcolor=#fefefe
| 131770 ||  || — || January 5, 2002 || Haleakala || NEAT || V || align=right | 1.5 km || 
|-id=771 bgcolor=#fefefe
| 131771 ||  || — || January 5, 2002 || Haleakala || NEAT || — || align=right | 1.9 km || 
|-id=772 bgcolor=#fefefe
| 131772 ||  || — || January 13, 2002 || Oizumi || T. Kobayashi || NYS || align=right | 1.5 km || 
|-id=773 bgcolor=#fefefe
| 131773 ||  || — || January 13, 2002 || Oizumi || T. Kobayashi || — || align=right | 1.9 km || 
|-id=774 bgcolor=#FA8072
| 131774 ||  || — || January 8, 2002 || Haleakala || NEAT || — || align=right | 2.7 km || 
|-id=775 bgcolor=#fefefe
| 131775 ||  || — || January 5, 2002 || Haleakala || NEAT || — || align=right | 1.9 km || 
|-id=776 bgcolor=#fefefe
| 131776 ||  || — || January 5, 2002 || Haleakala || NEAT || — || align=right | 1.8 km || 
|-id=777 bgcolor=#FA8072
| 131777 ||  || — || January 8, 2002 || Socorro || LINEAR || — || align=right | 1.4 km || 
|-id=778 bgcolor=#fefefe
| 131778 ||  || — || January 5, 2002 || Haleakala || NEAT || — || align=right | 1.4 km || 
|-id=779 bgcolor=#fefefe
| 131779 ||  || — || January 5, 2002 || Haleakala || NEAT || FLO || align=right | 1.5 km || 
|-id=780 bgcolor=#fefefe
| 131780 ||  || — || January 8, 2002 || Palomar || NEAT || NYS || align=right data-sort-value="0.94" | 940 m || 
|-id=781 bgcolor=#fefefe
| 131781 ||  || — || January 6, 2002 || Palomar || NEAT || — || align=right | 1.8 km || 
|-id=782 bgcolor=#fefefe
| 131782 ||  || — || January 14, 2002 || Desert Eagle || W. K. Y. Yeung || NYS || align=right | 1.1 km || 
|-id=783 bgcolor=#fefefe
| 131783 ||  || — || January 14, 2002 || Desert Eagle || W. K. Y. Yeung || — || align=right | 3.6 km || 
|-id=784 bgcolor=#fefefe
| 131784 ||  || — || January 5, 2002 || Anderson Mesa || LONEOS || — || align=right | 1.5 km || 
|-id=785 bgcolor=#fefefe
| 131785 ||  || — || January 7, 2002 || Anderson Mesa || LONEOS || — || align=right | 1.3 km || 
|-id=786 bgcolor=#fefefe
| 131786 ||  || — || January 7, 2002 || Anderson Mesa || LONEOS || — || align=right | 1.0 km || 
|-id=787 bgcolor=#fefefe
| 131787 ||  || — || January 8, 2002 || Socorro || LINEAR || — || align=right | 1.6 km || 
|-id=788 bgcolor=#fefefe
| 131788 ||  || — || January 9, 2002 || Socorro || LINEAR || — || align=right | 1.4 km || 
|-id=789 bgcolor=#fefefe
| 131789 ||  || — || January 10, 2002 || Palomar || NEAT || NYS || align=right | 1.4 km || 
|-id=790 bgcolor=#fefefe
| 131790 ||  || — || January 9, 2002 || Socorro || LINEAR || NYS || align=right | 1.0 km || 
|-id=791 bgcolor=#fefefe
| 131791 ||  || — || January 9, 2002 || Socorro || LINEAR || NYS || align=right | 1.0 km || 
|-id=792 bgcolor=#E9E9E9
| 131792 ||  || — || January 9, 2002 || Socorro || LINEAR || — || align=right | 1.4 km || 
|-id=793 bgcolor=#fefefe
| 131793 ||  || — || January 9, 2002 || Socorro || LINEAR || NYS || align=right | 1.0 km || 
|-id=794 bgcolor=#fefefe
| 131794 ||  || — || January 9, 2002 || Socorro || LINEAR || MAS || align=right | 1.3 km || 
|-id=795 bgcolor=#fefefe
| 131795 ||  || — || January 9, 2002 || Socorro || LINEAR || NYS || align=right data-sort-value="0.91" | 910 m || 
|-id=796 bgcolor=#fefefe
| 131796 ||  || — || January 9, 2002 || Socorro || LINEAR || NYS || align=right | 1.1 km || 
|-id=797 bgcolor=#fefefe
| 131797 ||  || — || January 9, 2002 || Socorro || LINEAR || MAS || align=right | 1.1 km || 
|-id=798 bgcolor=#fefefe
| 131798 ||  || — || January 9, 2002 || Socorro || LINEAR || — || align=right | 1.2 km || 
|-id=799 bgcolor=#fefefe
| 131799 ||  || — || January 9, 2002 || Socorro || LINEAR || NYS || align=right data-sort-value="0.97" | 970 m || 
|-id=800 bgcolor=#fefefe
| 131800 ||  || — || January 9, 2002 || Socorro || LINEAR || NYS || align=right data-sort-value="0.90" | 900 m || 
|}

131801–131900 

|-bgcolor=#E9E9E9
| 131801 ||  || — || January 9, 2002 || Socorro || LINEAR || — || align=right | 1.8 km || 
|-id=802 bgcolor=#fefefe
| 131802 ||  || — || January 9, 2002 || Socorro || LINEAR || — || align=right | 1.1 km || 
|-id=803 bgcolor=#fefefe
| 131803 ||  || — || January 9, 2002 || Socorro || LINEAR || — || align=right | 1.7 km || 
|-id=804 bgcolor=#fefefe
| 131804 ||  || — || January 11, 2002 || Socorro || LINEAR || — || align=right | 2.9 km || 
|-id=805 bgcolor=#fefefe
| 131805 ||  || — || January 11, 2002 || Socorro || LINEAR || NYS || align=right | 1.3 km || 
|-id=806 bgcolor=#fefefe
| 131806 ||  || — || January 12, 2002 || Socorro || LINEAR || — || align=right | 1.7 km || 
|-id=807 bgcolor=#fefefe
| 131807 ||  || — || January 8, 2002 || Socorro || LINEAR || NYS || align=right | 1.2 km || 
|-id=808 bgcolor=#fefefe
| 131808 ||  || — || January 8, 2002 || Socorro || LINEAR || — || align=right data-sort-value="0.95" | 950 m || 
|-id=809 bgcolor=#fefefe
| 131809 ||  || — || January 9, 2002 || Socorro || LINEAR || — || align=right | 1.4 km || 
|-id=810 bgcolor=#fefefe
| 131810 ||  || — || January 9, 2002 || Socorro || LINEAR || — || align=right | 1.5 km || 
|-id=811 bgcolor=#E9E9E9
| 131811 ||  || — || January 9, 2002 || Socorro || LINEAR || — || align=right | 2.2 km || 
|-id=812 bgcolor=#fefefe
| 131812 ||  || — || January 9, 2002 || Socorro || LINEAR || — || align=right | 1.2 km || 
|-id=813 bgcolor=#fefefe
| 131813 ||  || — || January 9, 2002 || Socorro || LINEAR || — || align=right | 1.6 km || 
|-id=814 bgcolor=#fefefe
| 131814 ||  || — || January 9, 2002 || Socorro || LINEAR || — || align=right | 1.5 km || 
|-id=815 bgcolor=#fefefe
| 131815 ||  || — || January 9, 2002 || Socorro || LINEAR || V || align=right | 1.3 km || 
|-id=816 bgcolor=#fefefe
| 131816 ||  || — || January 11, 2002 || Socorro || LINEAR || — || align=right | 1.9 km || 
|-id=817 bgcolor=#fefefe
| 131817 ||  || — || January 11, 2002 || Socorro || LINEAR || — || align=right | 2.1 km || 
|-id=818 bgcolor=#fefefe
| 131818 ||  || — || January 13, 2002 || Socorro || LINEAR || NYS || align=right | 3.4 km || 
|-id=819 bgcolor=#fefefe
| 131819 ||  || — || January 8, 2002 || Socorro || LINEAR || — || align=right data-sort-value="0.91" | 910 m || 
|-id=820 bgcolor=#fefefe
| 131820 ||  || — || January 8, 2002 || Socorro || LINEAR || — || align=right | 1.1 km || 
|-id=821 bgcolor=#fefefe
| 131821 ||  || — || January 8, 2002 || Socorro || LINEAR || NYS || align=right | 1.2 km || 
|-id=822 bgcolor=#fefefe
| 131822 ||  || — || January 8, 2002 || Socorro || LINEAR || — || align=right data-sort-value="0.95" | 950 m || 
|-id=823 bgcolor=#FA8072
| 131823 ||  || — || January 8, 2002 || Socorro || LINEAR || — || align=right | 1.9 km || 
|-id=824 bgcolor=#fefefe
| 131824 ||  || — || January 8, 2002 || Socorro || LINEAR || — || align=right | 1.6 km || 
|-id=825 bgcolor=#fefefe
| 131825 ||  || — || January 8, 2002 || Socorro || LINEAR || — || align=right | 1.9 km || 
|-id=826 bgcolor=#fefefe
| 131826 ||  || — || January 8, 2002 || Socorro || LINEAR || FLO || align=right | 1.5 km || 
|-id=827 bgcolor=#fefefe
| 131827 ||  || — || January 8, 2002 || Socorro || LINEAR || — || align=right | 1.4 km || 
|-id=828 bgcolor=#fefefe
| 131828 ||  || — || January 9, 2002 || Socorro || LINEAR || — || align=right | 1.6 km || 
|-id=829 bgcolor=#fefefe
| 131829 ||  || — || January 9, 2002 || Socorro || LINEAR || NYS || align=right | 1.1 km || 
|-id=830 bgcolor=#fefefe
| 131830 ||  || — || January 9, 2002 || Socorro || LINEAR || V || align=right | 1.3 km || 
|-id=831 bgcolor=#fefefe
| 131831 ||  || — || January 9, 2002 || Socorro || LINEAR || MAS || align=right | 1.1 km || 
|-id=832 bgcolor=#fefefe
| 131832 ||  || — || January 9, 2002 || Socorro || LINEAR || FLO || align=right | 1.3 km || 
|-id=833 bgcolor=#fefefe
| 131833 ||  || — || January 9, 2002 || Socorro || LINEAR || — || align=right | 1.6 km || 
|-id=834 bgcolor=#fefefe
| 131834 ||  || — || January 9, 2002 || Socorro || LINEAR || NYS || align=right | 1.2 km || 
|-id=835 bgcolor=#fefefe
| 131835 ||  || — || January 9, 2002 || Socorro || LINEAR || — || align=right | 1.2 km || 
|-id=836 bgcolor=#fefefe
| 131836 ||  || — || January 9, 2002 || Socorro || LINEAR || NYS || align=right | 3.1 km || 
|-id=837 bgcolor=#fefefe
| 131837 ||  || — || January 9, 2002 || Socorro || LINEAR || — || align=right | 1.5 km || 
|-id=838 bgcolor=#fefefe
| 131838 ||  || — || January 9, 2002 || Socorro || LINEAR || FLO || align=right | 1.4 km || 
|-id=839 bgcolor=#E9E9E9
| 131839 ||  || — || January 9, 2002 || Socorro || LINEAR || EUN || align=right | 2.3 km || 
|-id=840 bgcolor=#fefefe
| 131840 ||  || — || January 9, 2002 || Socorro || LINEAR || NYS || align=right | 1.2 km || 
|-id=841 bgcolor=#fefefe
| 131841 ||  || — || January 9, 2002 || Socorro || LINEAR || V || align=right | 1.2 km || 
|-id=842 bgcolor=#fefefe
| 131842 ||  || — || January 9, 2002 || Socorro || LINEAR || — || align=right | 1.7 km || 
|-id=843 bgcolor=#fefefe
| 131843 ||  || — || January 9, 2002 || Socorro || LINEAR || — || align=right | 2.8 km || 
|-id=844 bgcolor=#fefefe
| 131844 ||  || — || January 9, 2002 || Socorro || LINEAR || — || align=right | 1.2 km || 
|-id=845 bgcolor=#fefefe
| 131845 ||  || — || January 9, 2002 || Socorro || LINEAR || NYS || align=right | 1.4 km || 
|-id=846 bgcolor=#fefefe
| 131846 ||  || — || January 9, 2002 || Socorro || LINEAR || — || align=right | 1.2 km || 
|-id=847 bgcolor=#fefefe
| 131847 ||  || — || January 9, 2002 || Socorro || LINEAR || FLO || align=right | 2.0 km || 
|-id=848 bgcolor=#fefefe
| 131848 ||  || — || January 9, 2002 || Socorro || LINEAR || — || align=right | 2.0 km || 
|-id=849 bgcolor=#fefefe
| 131849 ||  || — || January 11, 2002 || Socorro || LINEAR || — || align=right | 1.7 km || 
|-id=850 bgcolor=#fefefe
| 131850 ||  || — || January 11, 2002 || Socorro || LINEAR || ERI || align=right | 3.7 km || 
|-id=851 bgcolor=#fefefe
| 131851 ||  || — || January 11, 2002 || Socorro || LINEAR || — || align=right | 4.3 km || 
|-id=852 bgcolor=#fefefe
| 131852 ||  || — || January 13, 2002 || Socorro || LINEAR || — || align=right | 1.3 km || 
|-id=853 bgcolor=#fefefe
| 131853 ||  || — || January 13, 2002 || Needville || Needville Obs. || — || align=right | 1.3 km || 
|-id=854 bgcolor=#fefefe
| 131854 ||  || — || January 12, 2002 || Palomar || NEAT || — || align=right | 1.4 km || 
|-id=855 bgcolor=#fefefe
| 131855 ||  || — || January 8, 2002 || Socorro || LINEAR || MAS || align=right | 1.1 km || 
|-id=856 bgcolor=#fefefe
| 131856 ||  || — || January 9, 2002 || Socorro || LINEAR || — || align=right | 1.2 km || 
|-id=857 bgcolor=#fefefe
| 131857 ||  || — || January 13, 2002 || Socorro || LINEAR || MAS || align=right | 1.2 km || 
|-id=858 bgcolor=#fefefe
| 131858 ||  || — || January 13, 2002 || Socorro || LINEAR || FLO || align=right | 1.5 km || 
|-id=859 bgcolor=#fefefe
| 131859 ||  || — || January 14, 2002 || Socorro || LINEAR || NYS || align=right | 1.3 km || 
|-id=860 bgcolor=#fefefe
| 131860 ||  || — || January 11, 2002 || Anderson Mesa || LONEOS || — || align=right | 1.6 km || 
|-id=861 bgcolor=#fefefe
| 131861 ||  || — || January 11, 2002 || Socorro || LINEAR || NYS || align=right | 1.5 km || 
|-id=862 bgcolor=#fefefe
| 131862 ||  || — || January 14, 2002 || Socorro || LINEAR || NYS || align=right | 3.1 km || 
|-id=863 bgcolor=#fefefe
| 131863 ||  || — || January 14, 2002 || Socorro || LINEAR || NYS || align=right | 1.0 km || 
|-id=864 bgcolor=#fefefe
| 131864 ||  || — || January 14, 2002 || Socorro || LINEAR || — || align=right | 2.6 km || 
|-id=865 bgcolor=#fefefe
| 131865 ||  || — || January 14, 2002 || Socorro || LINEAR || MAS || align=right | 1.5 km || 
|-id=866 bgcolor=#fefefe
| 131866 ||  || — || January 14, 2002 || Socorro || LINEAR || ERI || align=right | 3.1 km || 
|-id=867 bgcolor=#fefefe
| 131867 ||  || — || January 14, 2002 || Socorro || LINEAR || NYS || align=right | 1.3 km || 
|-id=868 bgcolor=#E9E9E9
| 131868 ||  || — || January 14, 2002 || Socorro || LINEAR || — || align=right | 2.8 km || 
|-id=869 bgcolor=#fefefe
| 131869 ||  || — || January 14, 2002 || Socorro || LINEAR || MAS || align=right | 1.7 km || 
|-id=870 bgcolor=#E9E9E9
| 131870 ||  || — || January 13, 2002 || Socorro || LINEAR || — || align=right | 1.5 km || 
|-id=871 bgcolor=#fefefe
| 131871 ||  || — || January 13, 2002 || Socorro || LINEAR || — || align=right | 1.2 km || 
|-id=872 bgcolor=#fefefe
| 131872 ||  || — || January 13, 2002 || Socorro || LINEAR || — || align=right | 1.5 km || 
|-id=873 bgcolor=#fefefe
| 131873 ||  || — || January 13, 2002 || Socorro || LINEAR || FLO || align=right | 1.2 km || 
|-id=874 bgcolor=#fefefe
| 131874 ||  || — || January 13, 2002 || Socorro || LINEAR || V || align=right | 1.1 km || 
|-id=875 bgcolor=#fefefe
| 131875 ||  || — || January 13, 2002 || Socorro || LINEAR || NYS || align=right | 1.2 km || 
|-id=876 bgcolor=#fefefe
| 131876 ||  || — || January 13, 2002 || Socorro || LINEAR || NYS || align=right | 1.2 km || 
|-id=877 bgcolor=#fefefe
| 131877 ||  || — || January 13, 2002 || Socorro || LINEAR || NYS || align=right | 1.5 km || 
|-id=878 bgcolor=#fefefe
| 131878 ||  || — || January 13, 2002 || Socorro || LINEAR || NYS || align=right | 1.2 km || 
|-id=879 bgcolor=#fefefe
| 131879 ||  || — || January 13, 2002 || Socorro || LINEAR || — || align=right | 1.8 km || 
|-id=880 bgcolor=#fefefe
| 131880 ||  || — || January 13, 2002 || Socorro || LINEAR || V || align=right | 1.1 km || 
|-id=881 bgcolor=#fefefe
| 131881 ||  || — || January 13, 2002 || Socorro || LINEAR || — || align=right | 1.5 km || 
|-id=882 bgcolor=#fefefe
| 131882 ||  || — || January 13, 2002 || Socorro || LINEAR || NYS || align=right | 1.2 km || 
|-id=883 bgcolor=#fefefe
| 131883 ||  || — || January 13, 2002 || Socorro || LINEAR || NYS || align=right | 2.0 km || 
|-id=884 bgcolor=#fefefe
| 131884 ||  || — || January 13, 2002 || Socorro || LINEAR || NYS || align=right | 1.5 km || 
|-id=885 bgcolor=#fefefe
| 131885 ||  || — || January 14, 2002 || Socorro || LINEAR || MAS || align=right | 1.2 km || 
|-id=886 bgcolor=#fefefe
| 131886 ||  || — || January 15, 2002 || Socorro || LINEAR || — || align=right | 1.1 km || 
|-id=887 bgcolor=#fefefe
| 131887 ||  || — || January 14, 2002 || Socorro || LINEAR || SUL || align=right | 3.5 km || 
|-id=888 bgcolor=#fefefe
| 131888 ||  || — || January 14, 2002 || Socorro || LINEAR || — || align=right | 1.2 km || 
|-id=889 bgcolor=#fefefe
| 131889 ||  || — || January 14, 2002 || Socorro || LINEAR || — || align=right | 1.2 km || 
|-id=890 bgcolor=#fefefe
| 131890 ||  || — || January 14, 2002 || Socorro || LINEAR || — || align=right | 1.8 km || 
|-id=891 bgcolor=#fefefe
| 131891 ||  || — || January 14, 2002 || Socorro || LINEAR || NYS || align=right | 1.4 km || 
|-id=892 bgcolor=#fefefe
| 131892 ||  || — || January 5, 2002 || Palomar || NEAT || — || align=right | 1.2 km || 
|-id=893 bgcolor=#fefefe
| 131893 ||  || — || January 5, 2002 || Anderson Mesa || LONEOS || — || align=right | 1.1 km || 
|-id=894 bgcolor=#fefefe
| 131894 ||  || — || January 7, 2002 || Palomar || NEAT || — || align=right | 1.5 km || 
|-id=895 bgcolor=#fefefe
| 131895 ||  || — || January 8, 2002 || Socorro || LINEAR || — || align=right | 1.6 km || 
|-id=896 bgcolor=#fefefe
| 131896 ||  || — || January 10, 2002 || Palomar || NEAT || — || align=right | 2.2 km || 
|-id=897 bgcolor=#fefefe
| 131897 ||  || — || January 8, 2002 || Palomar || NEAT || — || align=right | 1.3 km || 
|-id=898 bgcolor=#E9E9E9
| 131898 ||  || — || January 19, 2002 || Fountain Hills || C. W. Juels, P. R. Holvorcem || — || align=right | 4.5 km || 
|-id=899 bgcolor=#fefefe
| 131899 ||  || — || January 19, 2002 || Desert Eagle || W. K. Y. Yeung || — || align=right data-sort-value="0.87" | 870 m || 
|-id=900 bgcolor=#fefefe
| 131900 ||  || — || January 19, 2002 || Desert Eagle || W. K. Y. Yeung || NYS || align=right | 1.3 km || 
|}

131901–132000 

|-bgcolor=#fefefe
| 131901 ||  || — || January 21, 2002 || Desert Eagle || W. K. Y. Yeung || — || align=right | 1.7 km || 
|-id=902 bgcolor=#E9E9E9
| 131902 ||  || — || January 21, 2002 || Desert Eagle || W. K. Y. Yeung || JUN || align=right | 3.4 km || 
|-id=903 bgcolor=#fefefe
| 131903 ||  || — || January 18, 2002 || Socorro || LINEAR || V || align=right | 1.4 km || 
|-id=904 bgcolor=#fefefe
| 131904 ||  || — || January 18, 2002 || Socorro || LINEAR || — || align=right | 2.0 km || 
|-id=905 bgcolor=#FA8072
| 131905 ||  || — || January 18, 2002 || Socorro || LINEAR || — || align=right | 2.2 km || 
|-id=906 bgcolor=#fefefe
| 131906 ||  || — || January 18, 2002 || Socorro || LINEAR || — || align=right | 2.0 km || 
|-id=907 bgcolor=#fefefe
| 131907 ||  || — || January 19, 2002 || Socorro || LINEAR || NYS || align=right | 1.8 km || 
|-id=908 bgcolor=#fefefe
| 131908 ||  || — || January 19, 2002 || Socorro || LINEAR || — || align=right | 1.1 km || 
|-id=909 bgcolor=#fefefe
| 131909 ||  || — || January 19, 2002 || Socorro || LINEAR || NYS || align=right | 1.0 km || 
|-id=910 bgcolor=#fefefe
| 131910 ||  || — || January 19, 2002 || Socorro || LINEAR || — || align=right | 1.6 km || 
|-id=911 bgcolor=#fefefe
| 131911 ||  || — || January 19, 2002 || Socorro || LINEAR || NYS || align=right | 1.0 km || 
|-id=912 bgcolor=#fefefe
| 131912 ||  || — || January 19, 2002 || Socorro || LINEAR || NYS || align=right | 3.2 km || 
|-id=913 bgcolor=#fefefe
| 131913 ||  || — || January 19, 2002 || Socorro || LINEAR || V || align=right | 1.4 km || 
|-id=914 bgcolor=#E9E9E9
| 131914 ||  || — || January 19, 2002 || Socorro || LINEAR || — || align=right | 4.4 km || 
|-id=915 bgcolor=#fefefe
| 131915 ||  || — || January 21, 2002 || Socorro || LINEAR || — || align=right | 1.5 km || 
|-id=916 bgcolor=#fefefe
| 131916 ||  || — || January 21, 2002 || Socorro || LINEAR || — || align=right | 1.5 km || 
|-id=917 bgcolor=#fefefe
| 131917 ||  || — || January 21, 2002 || Palomar || NEAT || — || align=right | 1.8 km || 
|-id=918 bgcolor=#fefefe
| 131918 ||  || — || January 22, 2002 || Socorro || LINEAR || FLO || align=right | 3.7 km || 
|-id=919 bgcolor=#fefefe
| 131919 ||  || — || January 23, 2002 || Socorro || LINEAR || — || align=right | 1.7 km || 
|-id=920 bgcolor=#fefefe
| 131920 ||  || — || January 19, 2002 || Socorro || LINEAR || — || align=right | 1.8 km || 
|-id=921 bgcolor=#fefefe
| 131921 ||  || — || January 19, 2002 || Anderson Mesa || LONEOS || — || align=right | 1.6 km || 
|-id=922 bgcolor=#E9E9E9
| 131922 ||  || — || January 19, 2002 || Anderson Mesa || LONEOS || — || align=right | 2.4 km || 
|-id=923 bgcolor=#fefefe
| 131923 ||  || — || February 4, 2002 || Badlands || R. Dyvig || NYS || align=right | 1.3 km || 
|-id=924 bgcolor=#fefefe
| 131924 ||  || — || February 3, 2002 || Palomar || NEAT || V || align=right | 1.7 km || 
|-id=925 bgcolor=#fefefe
| 131925 ||  || — || February 3, 2002 || Palomar || NEAT || — || align=right | 1.6 km || 
|-id=926 bgcolor=#fefefe
| 131926 ||  || — || February 3, 2002 || Palomar || NEAT || FLO || align=right data-sort-value="0.88" | 880 m || 
|-id=927 bgcolor=#fefefe
| 131927 ||  || — || February 3, 2002 || Palomar || NEAT || — || align=right | 3.7 km || 
|-id=928 bgcolor=#fefefe
| 131928 ||  || — || February 5, 2002 || Fountain Hills || C. W. Juels, P. R. Holvorcem || — || align=right | 1.8 km || 
|-id=929 bgcolor=#fefefe
| 131929 ||  || — || February 4, 2002 || Palomar || NEAT || — || align=right | 1.3 km || 
|-id=930 bgcolor=#fefefe
| 131930 ||  || — || February 4, 2002 || Haleakala || NEAT || MAS || align=right | 1.6 km || 
|-id=931 bgcolor=#fefefe
| 131931 ||  || — || February 5, 2002 || Palomar || NEAT || NYS || align=right data-sort-value="0.89" | 890 m || 
|-id=932 bgcolor=#fefefe
| 131932 ||  || — || February 6, 2002 || Desert Eagle || W. K. Y. Yeung || NYS || align=right | 1.4 km || 
|-id=933 bgcolor=#fefefe
| 131933 ||  || — || February 8, 2002 || Fountain Hills || C. W. Juels, P. R. Holvorcem || — || align=right | 2.3 km || 
|-id=934 bgcolor=#fefefe
| 131934 ||  || — || February 8, 2002 || Fountain Hills || C. W. Juels, P. R. Holvorcem || — || align=right | 5.0 km || 
|-id=935 bgcolor=#fefefe
| 131935 ||  || — || February 8, 2002 || Desert Eagle || W. K. Y. Yeung || NYS || align=right | 1.9 km || 
|-id=936 bgcolor=#fefefe
| 131936 ||  || — || February 9, 2002 || Nashville || R. Clingan || — || align=right | 1.5 km || 
|-id=937 bgcolor=#fefefe
| 131937 ||  || — || February 9, 2002 || Desert Eagle || W. K. Y. Yeung || NYS || align=right | 1.4 km || 
|-id=938 bgcolor=#fefefe
| 131938 ||  || — || February 9, 2002 || Desert Eagle || W. K. Y. Yeung || — || align=right | 1.4 km || 
|-id=939 bgcolor=#fefefe
| 131939 ||  || — || February 9, 2002 || Desert Eagle || W. K. Y. Yeung || — || align=right | 1.3 km || 
|-id=940 bgcolor=#fefefe
| 131940 ||  || — || February 6, 2002 || Haleakala || NEAT || V || align=right | 1.3 km || 
|-id=941 bgcolor=#fefefe
| 131941 ||  || — || February 7, 2002 || Kitt Peak || Spacewatch || MAS || align=right | 1.5 km || 
|-id=942 bgcolor=#fefefe
| 131942 ||  || — || February 6, 2002 || Socorro || LINEAR || FLO || align=right | 1.5 km || 
|-id=943 bgcolor=#fefefe
| 131943 ||  || — || February 6, 2002 || Socorro || LINEAR || — || align=right | 1.9 km || 
|-id=944 bgcolor=#fefefe
| 131944 ||  || — || February 6, 2002 || Socorro || LINEAR || — || align=right | 1.5 km || 
|-id=945 bgcolor=#fefefe
| 131945 ||  || — || February 6, 2002 || Socorro || LINEAR || — || align=right | 2.2 km || 
|-id=946 bgcolor=#fefefe
| 131946 ||  || — || February 6, 2002 || Socorro || LINEAR || — || align=right | 1.7 km || 
|-id=947 bgcolor=#fefefe
| 131947 ||  || — || February 6, 2002 || Socorro || LINEAR || — || align=right | 1.2 km || 
|-id=948 bgcolor=#fefefe
| 131948 ||  || — || February 6, 2002 || Socorro || LINEAR || FLO || align=right | 1.5 km || 
|-id=949 bgcolor=#fefefe
| 131949 ||  || — || February 6, 2002 || Socorro || LINEAR || FLO || align=right | 1.1 km || 
|-id=950 bgcolor=#fefefe
| 131950 ||  || — || February 6, 2002 || Socorro || LINEAR || V || align=right data-sort-value="0.92" | 920 m || 
|-id=951 bgcolor=#fefefe
| 131951 ||  || — || February 6, 2002 || Socorro || LINEAR || — || align=right | 1.3 km || 
|-id=952 bgcolor=#fefefe
| 131952 ||  || — || February 6, 2002 || Socorro || LINEAR || — || align=right | 1.8 km || 
|-id=953 bgcolor=#fefefe
| 131953 ||  || — || February 7, 2002 || Socorro || LINEAR || NYS || align=right | 1.3 km || 
|-id=954 bgcolor=#fefefe
| 131954 ||  || — || February 7, 2002 || Socorro || LINEAR || NYS || align=right | 1.4 km || 
|-id=955 bgcolor=#fefefe
| 131955 ||  || — || February 7, 2002 || Socorro || LINEAR || — || align=right | 1.3 km || 
|-id=956 bgcolor=#fefefe
| 131956 ||  || — || February 7, 2002 || Socorro || LINEAR || MAS || align=right | 1.6 km || 
|-id=957 bgcolor=#fefefe
| 131957 ||  || — || February 11, 2002 || Desert Eagle || W. K. Y. Yeung || — || align=right | 1.5 km || 
|-id=958 bgcolor=#fefefe
| 131958 ||  || — || February 7, 2002 || Haleakala || NEAT || — || align=right | 1.5 km || 
|-id=959 bgcolor=#fefefe
| 131959 ||  || — || February 7, 2002 || Haleakala || NEAT || — || align=right | 2.9 km || 
|-id=960 bgcolor=#fefefe
| 131960 ||  || — || February 12, 2002 || Fountain Hills || C. W. Juels, P. R. Holvorcem || — || align=right | 1.9 km || 
|-id=961 bgcolor=#fefefe
| 131961 ||  || — || February 12, 2002 || Fountain Hills || C. W. Juels, P. R. Holvorcem || — || align=right | 4.7 km || 
|-id=962 bgcolor=#fefefe
| 131962 ||  || — || February 8, 2002 || Kitt Peak || Spacewatch || — || align=right | 1.3 km || 
|-id=963 bgcolor=#fefefe
| 131963 ||  || — || February 3, 2002 || Haleakala || NEAT || V || align=right | 1.2 km || 
|-id=964 bgcolor=#fefefe
| 131964 ||  || — || February 3, 2002 || Haleakala || NEAT || — || align=right | 1.4 km || 
|-id=965 bgcolor=#fefefe
| 131965 ||  || — || February 12, 2002 || Desert Eagle || W. K. Y. Yeung || NYS || align=right | 1.2 km || 
|-id=966 bgcolor=#fefefe
| 131966 ||  || — || February 12, 2002 || Desert Eagle || W. K. Y. Yeung || — || align=right | 1.8 km || 
|-id=967 bgcolor=#fefefe
| 131967 ||  || — || February 12, 2002 || Fountain Hills || C. W. Juels, P. R. Holvorcem || V || align=right | 1.7 km || 
|-id=968 bgcolor=#fefefe
| 131968 ||  || — || February 7, 2002 || Socorro || LINEAR || FLO || align=right | 1.4 km || 
|-id=969 bgcolor=#fefefe
| 131969 ||  || — || February 7, 2002 || Socorro || LINEAR || — || align=right | 1.9 km || 
|-id=970 bgcolor=#fefefe
| 131970 ||  || — || February 7, 2002 || Socorro || LINEAR || NYS || align=right | 1.3 km || 
|-id=971 bgcolor=#fefefe
| 131971 ||  || — || February 7, 2002 || Socorro || LINEAR || — || align=right | 1.4 km || 
|-id=972 bgcolor=#E9E9E9
| 131972 ||  || — || February 7, 2002 || Socorro || LINEAR || — || align=right | 2.7 km || 
|-id=973 bgcolor=#fefefe
| 131973 ||  || — || February 7, 2002 || Socorro || LINEAR || NYS || align=right | 1.6 km || 
|-id=974 bgcolor=#fefefe
| 131974 ||  || — || February 7, 2002 || Socorro || LINEAR || NYS || align=right | 1.4 km || 
|-id=975 bgcolor=#fefefe
| 131975 ||  || — || February 7, 2002 || Kitt Peak || Spacewatch || — || align=right | 1.3 km || 
|-id=976 bgcolor=#fefefe
| 131976 ||  || — || February 6, 2002 || Socorro || LINEAR || — || align=right | 1.9 km || 
|-id=977 bgcolor=#fefefe
| 131977 ||  || — || February 6, 2002 || Socorro || LINEAR || — || align=right | 1.6 km || 
|-id=978 bgcolor=#fefefe
| 131978 ||  || — || February 6, 2002 || Socorro || LINEAR || V || align=right | 1.4 km || 
|-id=979 bgcolor=#fefefe
| 131979 ||  || — || February 6, 2002 || Socorro || LINEAR || — || align=right | 1.5 km || 
|-id=980 bgcolor=#fefefe
| 131980 ||  || — || February 7, 2002 || Socorro || LINEAR || — || align=right | 1.3 km || 
|-id=981 bgcolor=#fefefe
| 131981 ||  || — || February 7, 2002 || Socorro || LINEAR || — || align=right | 1.1 km || 
|-id=982 bgcolor=#fefefe
| 131982 ||  || — || February 7, 2002 || Socorro || LINEAR || — || align=right | 1.1 km || 
|-id=983 bgcolor=#fefefe
| 131983 ||  || — || February 7, 2002 || Socorro || LINEAR || MAS || align=right | 1.2 km || 
|-id=984 bgcolor=#fefefe
| 131984 ||  || — || February 7, 2002 || Socorro || LINEAR || NYS || align=right | 2.5 km || 
|-id=985 bgcolor=#fefefe
| 131985 ||  || — || February 7, 2002 || Socorro || LINEAR || MAS || align=right | 1.3 km || 
|-id=986 bgcolor=#fefefe
| 131986 ||  || — || February 7, 2002 || Socorro || LINEAR || ERI || align=right | 1.8 km || 
|-id=987 bgcolor=#d6d6d6
| 131987 ||  || — || February 7, 2002 || Socorro || LINEAR || KAR || align=right | 2.4 km || 
|-id=988 bgcolor=#fefefe
| 131988 ||  || — || February 7, 2002 || Socorro || LINEAR || — || align=right | 1.6 km || 
|-id=989 bgcolor=#E9E9E9
| 131989 ||  || — || February 7, 2002 || Socorro || LINEAR || — || align=right | 1.3 km || 
|-id=990 bgcolor=#fefefe
| 131990 ||  || — || February 7, 2002 || Socorro || LINEAR || NYS || align=right data-sort-value="0.95" | 950 m || 
|-id=991 bgcolor=#fefefe
| 131991 ||  || — || February 7, 2002 || Socorro || LINEAR || — || align=right | 2.7 km || 
|-id=992 bgcolor=#fefefe
| 131992 ||  || — || February 7, 2002 || Socorro || LINEAR || MAS || align=right | 1.6 km || 
|-id=993 bgcolor=#fefefe
| 131993 ||  || — || February 7, 2002 || Socorro || LINEAR || NYS || align=right | 1.2 km || 
|-id=994 bgcolor=#E9E9E9
| 131994 ||  || — || February 7, 2002 || Socorro || LINEAR || — || align=right | 2.3 km || 
|-id=995 bgcolor=#fefefe
| 131995 ||  || — || February 7, 2002 || Socorro || LINEAR || NYS || align=right | 1.2 km || 
|-id=996 bgcolor=#fefefe
| 131996 ||  || — || February 7, 2002 || Socorro || LINEAR || NYS || align=right | 1.4 km || 
|-id=997 bgcolor=#fefefe
| 131997 ||  || — || February 7, 2002 || Socorro || LINEAR || FLO || align=right | 1.2 km || 
|-id=998 bgcolor=#fefefe
| 131998 ||  || — || February 7, 2002 || Socorro || LINEAR || MAS || align=right | 1.6 km || 
|-id=999 bgcolor=#fefefe
| 131999 ||  || — || February 7, 2002 || Socorro || LINEAR || NYS || align=right | 1.6 km || 
|-id=000 bgcolor=#fefefe
| 132000 ||  || — || February 7, 2002 || Socorro || LINEAR || NYS || align=right | 1.6 km || 
|}

References

External links 
 Discovery Circumstances: Numbered Minor Planets (130001)–(135000) (IAU Minor Planet Center)

0131